The following list describes each of the characters from the popular webseries Red vs. Blue, originally created by Rooster Teeth Productions.

Note that some of the characters listed are either currently MIA (Missing in Action), KIA (Killed in Action), reoccurring, and/or are important to the plot of each season.

Main characters

Red Team

Sarge
Super Colonel Sarge (voiced by Matt Hullum) is the leader of the Red Team on Blood Gulch. He has a Southern accent, and has a military background and briefly joined the ODSTs. Sarge is somewhat bloodthirsty, and the only Blood Gulch soldier on either team to actually be serious about war. As a result, Sarge gets unsatisfied at times of peace and is often willing to join new battles, which in Season 15 led him to delusional battles while in retirement – first creating an army of robots, then declaring war on gravity – and then join the Blues and Reds to help the war on the UNSC, betraying the Reds and Blues. His preferred weapon is a shotgun, which he carries at all times. Sarge has a passionate disgust for Grif, demonstrated by his repeated willingness to sacrifice Grif during combat missions as well as creating numerous contingency plans that all consist of killing Grif outright. He has something of a father-son relationship with Simmons, but is either oblivious to Simmons' feelings or just doesn't seem to care. He displays little knowledge of strategy or tactics and his plans are often horrible suicide missions, but he is shown to be a good mechanic, able to repair Jeeps with limited supplies and construct complex droids, and a good motivational speaker, speaking to both teams at various times throughout the later seasons. Sarge's real name is never revealed on screen. In Season 14, the cameraman asks Sarge for his name and rank, to which he replies 'Sarge'. Thinking he simply gave his rank, Sarge is then asked for his name, to which he insists that he 'just said that'. Sarge is implied to be the father of the character Boomstick from fellow Rooster Teeth series Death Battle in Season 14. Upon the pair's meeting, the two acknowledge their similarities, with Sarge noting having a son he doesn't know and Boomstick having a father who left to join the army; this connection is further implied in subsequent episodes of Death Battle. In Season 15, in exchange for their help, he tells Dylan and Jax his name. Though it is never said on screen, with Jax simply asking if it is 'Russian, Scandinavian or Pig Latin' as it 'sounded like 57 syllables' to which Sarge replies by saying that 'to spell it right, you need to use a Mandarin keyboard and the fifth letter is an emoji'. He is the red member of the team.

Sarge is played by Saul Portillo in the live-action, crossover episode Immersion: The Warthog Flip.

Simmons
Captain Richard "Dick" Simmons (voiced by Gus Sorola), upon his introduction, is the second-in-command of the Red Team, being an attentive and sycophantic follower to Sarge. Simmons is shown to be logical, practical and intelligent, showing extensive knowledge of technology and computers, making him the "smartest" out of all the Reds and Blues. However, his reasonable inquiries and effective battle plans and strategies are always overlooked by Sarge. Simmons even twice defected to the Blues after getting frustrated with Sarge. Simmons' worthiness is often hindered by his lack of self-confidence, insecurity (particularly regarding talking to women) and panicky nature - he loses control in time-sensitive or complicated situations, as well as in situations that highlight his fear of snakes. His catchphrase is "Yeah! Suck it, Blues!" He is the maroon member of the team.

Grif
Captain Dexter Grif (voiced by Geoff Ramsey) is noted for being lazy, grumpy, and gluttonous, which led to Sarge disliking him and constant bickering with his friend Simmons. In spite of his abrasive nature, Grif has a begrudging kinship to his teammates, and will eventually come to their aid. While Red vs. Blue: The Ultimate Fan Guide stated Grif was forced into the Red Army in a military draft, Season 16 instead reveals Grif enlisted after dropping out of college in Ithaca, New York. Grif is shown to be relatively adept at driving vehicles, even managing to fly a Pelican and a Hornet with next to no experience with aircraft. He is also shown to be exceptionally hard to kill, being able to survive multiple shots, being run over by a tank, and falling from extreme heights. He was twice promoted, first to Sergeant before Reconstruction once he was relocated out of Blood Gulch and Sarge refused to leave, but is later demoted to the fictitious rank of "Minor Junior Private Negative First Class" because of a deal between Sarge and Agent Washington; and then to Captain as leader of his own squad of Chorus' New Republic, which leads Sarge to ask a promotion to Colonel to continue outranking Grif. He is the orange member of the team.

Joe Nicolosi, who wrote and directed Season 15 and 16, has Grif as a favourite character, and thus he is heavily featured in those seasons. In the former, while he refuses to join the quest that leads the Reds and Blues out of their retirement moon, Grif goes insane from loneliness and guilt, eventually being brought by Locus to save his friends from the Blues and Reds. In The Shisno Paradox after convincing the Reds and Blues to get pizza, Grif decides to use what he learned from a book in narrative structure and avoid "incendiary incidents" that would lead to new adventures, going all the way to crashing the crew's ship to not answer a call from Locus. However, on the way to Grif's favourite pizzeria, which ends up destroyed, they are roped into a time-travelling plot by Donut.

Beginning in Halo 3, Grif has had a multiplayer game based around him called "Grifball". Inspired by a throwaway line in season 4 where Sarge comments that shooting Grif "is the best game since Grifball!", Rooster Teeth developed a rugby-like gaming mode where Grif would be repeatedly killed, as the objective is to carry a bomb all the way to the opposing team's goal, with the player holding the bomb having his armour changed to Grif's orange. Along with the other players trying to stop the "Grif" with Energy Swords and Gravity Hammers, scoring also leads the bomb to explode, often killing the carrier. As summed up by Burnie Burns, "everyone in the game is constantly trying to hammer-smash Grif and even if he scores, he explodes. Either way, Sarge wins."

Donut
He originally sported standard-issue red armour, but due to an inadvertent series of events, he is eventually given a pink armour, whose color Donut often denies, calling it "Lightish Red", and even causes the Blues to mistake him for a woman in the first two seasons. The pink armour also changes Donut's personality and makes him ambiguously homosexual, constantly spewing double entendres and talking with a more feminine attitude. While Donut is affable, his garrulous personality tends to annoy other members of the Red Team, along with being childish and gullible - Lopez, in particular, hates Donut's bad attempts at translating his Spanish speech. Donut's biggest combat skill is a proficiency in throwing grenades. He is the pink member of the team.

While Donut was one of the focal characters in The Blood Gulch Chronicles, he is often relegated to a minor role in later seasons, even being supposedly killed in the Recreation season finale, later revealed to have sent him into Recovery Mode, which locks down the user's armor in the event of heavy injuries. However, Donut serves as a major character in The Shisno Paradox and the main protagonist of Singularity. After being killed by temporal distortions, Donut is revived by Chrovos and convinced to turn on the Reds and Blues; after he realizes Chrovos intends to kill his friends, Donut turns against them and manages to partially seal Chrovos in their damaged prison. Shortly after, Donut attempts to free the Reds and Blues from the singularity they have been trapped in; after numerous failures, he instead restores Washington to his normal self, and the two free the others from the singularity. Donut leads the Reds and Blues to fix the time paradoxes they have created, but Genkins traps everyone except for Donut and Doc inside of the Labrynth. Donut and Doc free their friends, and Donut tricks Genkins into traveling to the beginning of time, resulting in him becoming Chrovos. Donut subsequently strikes out on his own and leaves the Reds and Blues, having decided to make a name for himself.

Lopez
Lopez the Heavy (Spanish: Lopez el Pesado [sic], full name Droid #01011331123; voiced by Burnie Burns) is a robotic mechanic built by Sarge with a robot kit. He does not speak in most of Season 1, and it is eventually revealed that he is a robot which is missing a speech unit. Sarge orders a speech unit, but accidentally damages it with a static electric discharge during the installation process, which causes Lopez to only speak Spanish. Sarge sees it as an improvement because the enemy won't be able to understand him if he's ever captured, despite not knowing Spanish himself. However, Lopez is able to understand English just fine. The extent to which the characters understand Lopez varies for the sake of comedy, with Sarge pretending to know what he is saying, and Donut's narrow grasp of Spanish leading to bad mistranslations. In his state of loneliness and guilt in Season 15, Grif becomes fluent in Spanish and is able to communicate fully with Lopez. Lopez has a stoic, tough personality, although as time went on he developed a pessimistic view, often questioning his orders and making sarcastic remarks about his teammates since he knows they can't understand him. He is the brown member of the team.

Blue Team

Church
Private Leonard L. Church (voiced by Burnie Burns) is the de facto leader of the Blood Gulch Blue Team. Rooster Teeth often uses Church to advance the plot by managing the situation at hand, despite his easily-angered disposition.  Another characteristic of Church is his terrible aim, mostly with his signature sniper rifle, though at one point he cannot hit a soldier standing a few feet away with a pistol. He is the cobalt member of the team.

To provide a twist in the character, Burns decided to kill Church early in the series and have him return as a "ghost." In Reconstruction, Washington reveals to Church that he is the Alpha AI from which the other Freelancer Program AIs originated. As like in Halo canon, smart AIs are based on an actual person, Church was based on the director of Project Freelancer, the original Dr. Leonard Church. Through psychological torture, the Alpha tried to keep his sanity by breaking off parts of his personality; these personality splinters become the AI fragments.

While shortly after his reveal as the Alpha Church is caught up in an electromagnetic pulse blast and destroyed, the character returns starting in Reconstruction through one of its fragments, Epsilon, which was the Alpha's memories. Upon his creation, Epsilon went rampant during the process of being implanted into Washington, causing Wash to go insane, the AI implantation program to be cancelled, and Epsilon to be sent into storage. In Reconstruction, Washington and Church retrieve the Epsilon capsule from a Freelancer facility, which Wash then gives to Caboose. In Revelation, it is revealed Caboose is trying to transfer the AI from the capsule to a new robotic body while telling stories to him, given Epsilon responds well to them given his status as a memory keeper. In the desert where Tucker was reassigned, Caboose finds a round artifact (a Monitor from Halo), and transfers Epsilon into it. Epsilon-Church has residual memories of the original Church, inheriting his voice and personality. However, his memories of Alpha's life on Blood Gulch are at first limited to the stories that Caboose had told him.

In Revelation, memory flashes of Epsilon-Church eventually lead him to a Freelancer facility, where he brings Tex back to life and transfers himself into a new human-like robot body, whose armor is the same color as the old Church's. Tex brings Epsilon to another Freelancer base and activates his recovery beacon as bait for Washington and the Meta. However, the Meta then captures Tex in a storage unit. After the battle, Church enters the unit to retrieve her.

In Season 9, Epsilon makes a recreation of Blood Gulch based on his memories inside the storage unit waiting for Tex to come to him. After reuniting with Tex and believing the memory unit to be failing, he decides to forget her to find inner peace before what he believes will be his demise. Caboose then brings him out of the memory unit. It is then revealed that Carolina helped them rescue Epsilon-Church so that he can help her kill the director. After Carolina confronts the director at the end of Season 10, Epsilon remains as the former Freelancer's partner.

During Season 13, Epsilon is shown to malfunction when overworked by  Carolina, and has started to fail due to his age and status as a fragment. This eventually leads to Church's ultimate demise: to ensure Tucker can wear The Meta's suit, Epsilon deconstructs himself into different Fragments, each running one of the suit's enhancements, which comes at the cost of erasing his memories and identity, effectively killing him. Once the battle is over, the fragments vanish.

In Season 14, it is revealed that the body of Church prior to his "death" in Season 1 was actually Pvt. Jimmy, who was talked about also in Season 1. Pvt. Jimmy was implanted with the Alpha before going into Blood Gulch, and that A.I. turned Pvt. Jimmy into Pvt. Leonard Church.

In season 15, the Reds and Blues are lured out of their retirement moon by a distress call which seemed to be from Church. However, it is later revealed it was a ruse by the Blues and Reds, who edited a message from the original Church to lure in the Reds and Blues to them. Still, through Loco's time machine, a portal is opened to Blood Gulch during the first season, and Caboose uses the opportunity to tells Church a heartfelt goodbye. In the post-credits scene, a confused Church resolves to forget this conversation ever happened. In Singularity, both incarnations of Church are among the AI characters possessed by Genkins. The actual Church makes a cameo appearance when an enraged Caboose beats Genkins out of him; an injured and confused Church then decides to nap.

Tucker
Captain Lavernius Tucker (voiced by Jason Saldaña) is known for his womanizing and oversexed mind, uttering the catchphrase "bow chicka bow wow" at every phrase he deems unintentionally sexual. His signature weapon is the Energy Sword, which Tucker finds in Season 3 and only works for him. The weapon also leads Tucker to be attacked by an Alien and impregnated with a parasitic embryo, which later becomes his hybrid son Junior. He turns out to be the best combatant among the original Reds and Blues, single-handedly fending off C.T.'s team in Recreation, and stabbing The Meta with his sword in the final fight of Revelation. Two running gags about Tucker had him complaining he never gets to use the Sniper Rifle – though in Season 5, Tucker turns out to shoot well with it – and his armor getting coated with "black stuff" whenever he goes through a teleporter. He is the aqua member of the team.

After the Blood Gulch Chronicles, it is stated that Tucker and Junior were recruited as ambassadors between the humans and aliens, and transferred to a desert. After being absent from Reconstruction aside from a brief voice appearance calling Freelancer Command about his mission, he returns in Recreation as Sarge, Caboose and Grif go to the desert. In the Chorus Trilogy, Tucker's evolution into a capable leader and combatant is a major theme, as he helps stop the Chorus Civil War, fend off the invaders who played both sides, and eventually wear The Meta's armor in a last stand against Charon Industries' troops.

In Season 15 and 16, Tucker has to deal with responsibility (he is forced to pay child support for several illegitimate children after impregnating several women on Chorus, and his recklessness to fight the Zealots guns blazing causes Washington to get shot) and egotism (he tries much to impress Sister, even becoming king of Camelot, which he renames "Camelto", until she calls out on Tucker's inflated image of himself).

Caboose
He is portrayed as one of the more eccentric characters in the series, with behavior varying from merely somewhat dim-witted in Season 1 to almost completely divorced from reality from Season 3 onward. This is most likely due to Omega ('O'Malley') possessing him in Season 1 and permanently damaging his mental faculties after he left. It is stated that Tucker and Church once "rebooted" his armor, causing his life support systems to shut down - including his oxygen supply, leading to brain damage that hindered Caboose's mental state. Despite his shortcomings, he is arguably the most genuinely loyal character and frequently displays above-average physical strength, which Church and Tucker describe as "God's way of compensating". Caboose also shows some knowledge of machinery, being able to transfer Epsilon from a storage unit to a Monitor in Recreation and being able to revive a Mantis Droid in Season 11, who he renamed "Freckles". He is the blue member of the team.

His unusual behavior frequently earns him animosity from the other characters. It is a running gag that Caboose either injures or kills anyone that he attempts to help, starting with the death of Church in the eighth episode of the series. In season 13, Freckles' memory chip is placed in Caboose's Assault Rifle to prevent him from shooting others, as whenever Caboose pulls the trigger, it instead fires confetti.

Ever since Reconstruction, Caboose wears a Mark V Mjolnir helmet, instead of Mark VI. This was done to make him easier to differentiate from Church, as their shades of blue look too similar on Halo 3, and another reason is because the producers felt the Mark V's older design better suited Caboose's personality.

During Season 15, Caboose does not believe Church is truly gone, thinking people come back to life if you care about them. Upon meeting the Blues and Reds, Caboose begins a friendship with his counterpart Loco. After being shown during imprisonment that the distress call from Church was a ruse, Caboose finally begins to accept that Church is truly gone. In the finale, Loco's machine opens a time portal to Blood Gulch, allowing Caboose to say goodbye to Church and move on.

In an early episode of the Rooster Teeth Podcast, Joel Heyman, Caboose's voice actor, revealed that Caboose is "the only character who is aware that he's in a video game." Heyman also explained during RTX 2017 that the reason for Caboose's tone of voice is because he "treats everything as if it was an animal". Caboose's apparent definition of "help someone" is "shoot them in the back".

Freckles
Freckles (originally voiced by Shane Newville) was an HRUNTING/YGGDRASIL Mark IX "Mantis" battle robot that was activated by Caboose, who later took him as a pet. After the Reds and Blues crash landed in an unknown location, in Season 11, Caboose discovered the damaged robot hidden in a cave and successfully repaired it. "Freckles", named so due to the spots on his face, caused great unease to everyone on both teams, as Freckles obeyed Caboose's every whim, according him the respect due a superior officer. This included the robot acting as Caboose's military-justice enforcer when Washington (accidentally) gave command of the team to Caboose through a poor choice of words during a heated argument. During Caboose's tenure as team leader, everyone did as he said because otherwise Freckles would find them guilty of disobeying a superior officer in a time of war and issue the appropriate punishment: execution. Caboose eventually gave control of Freckles to Agent Washington when the two reconciled. He ended up destroyed during a strike by Locus and the Federal Army of Chorus.

In Season 12, Locus gave to the Reds and Blues the only reminder of Freckles, a memory chip, which turned out to have a tracker device on it. This was removed, and then the A.I. was placed into Caboose's Assault Rifle, which when combined with the gun's smart scope and stabilizer system, allowed Freckles to direct the gun to take out targets with efficiency. In Season 13, Freckles' ammunition was alternated with confetti, whenever Caboose pulls the trigger on his gun to prevent his constant injuries to teammates, and bullets when the robot was in control. This even helped the defeat of Felix once the mercenary attempted to fire with Caboose's rifle, only for confetti to come out and Freckles to recoil the gun into Felix's face.

In Season 15, Freckles (now voiced by Miles Luna) gets a new Mantis body, however a miniature one that barely reaches the characters' knees.

Sister
Kaikaina "Sister" Grif (voiced by Rebecca Frasier) is Grif's younger sister, who wears yellow armor. Her given name is even Hawaiian for younger sibling, albeit of the same sex (a sister to a male is "kaikuahine"). She was taken care of by Grif once their mother left for the circus - being both the fat lady and the bearded lady - and once he joined the army, Sister decided to enlist as well. She was brought into Blood Gulch on season 5, with her ship landing in the middle of the canyon and explaining Command had sent her as a new recruit since one team member will be promoted to replace their deceased commanding officer. However, in following episodes she is revealed to be colorblind and is actually part of Blue team. Sister then joins the Blues, initially entering conflicts with Tex but then bonding.

Sister is noted for her stupidity, promiscuity, and disturbing revelations - sometimes of a sexual nature - that other characters comment with "Yeah. Wait, what?", such as that she attempted to overdose on Aspirin and has the ability to ejaculate.

Sister is the only remaining Blue soldier in the canyon come Reconstruction. With the conflict stuck in a stalemate, as Sarge cannot bring himself into attacking a woman, she throws raves every night and refuses to give Washington information, believing he is a cop. After Sarge leaves to go after Grif and Simmons, Lopez strangles Sister to ensure the Reds' victory, before departing himself. However, she ends up surviving, as revealed in a cameo during Season 13. In season 15, Sister is revealed to organize events such as festivals and conventions on Blood Gulch to make usage of the abandoned bases. By the end of the season, she is reunited with her brother once the New Republic troops, who she met while in a business meeting on Chorus, arrive to check on the Reds and Blues, officially rejoining the main cast. In The Shisno Paradox, Sister is paired with Tucker in time travelling misadventures, mostly regarding Sister's intent to have sex with past celebrities.

Although Rebecca Frasier was a good friend of the Rooster Teeth production crew, Burnie Burns intended to allow other women to audition for the role of Sister despite the pressure of the other members. He notes two other girls auditioned for the role before Frasier was given her chance, but when she began auditioning the team made something of a joke out of the audition, slipping in increasingly more vulgar lines to see how far Frasier would go before refusing to read them. Upon realizing she had no such limits, Frasier was cast as Sister and the role was re-written as a far more promiscuous character to fit with the lines she had read in the audition.

Former Freelancer Agents

Wash
A former member of Project Freelancer, Agent Washington, also known as "Wash", true name David (Shannon McCormick), is infamous for an incident in his past where his AI, Epsilon, malfunctioned while still in his system. According to Washington, Epsilon's mind allegedly broke down and the AI would later "commit suicide" while still in Washington's head. This left his sanity questionable and as a result of the accident, Washington distrusts AI constructs, which made him fit for the Recovery Program as his commanders knew he would not take the retrieved AI for himself.

He is introduced as the main protagonist of the mini-series Recovery One, where he is sent to go after dead Freelancers in hope to retrieving their AI. Wash returns in Reconstruction, where to go after the Meta, he ends up recruiting the Reds and Blues given they had experience with an AI, O'Malley. After destroying the Meta's AI in the season finale with an EMP, Wash is imprisoned by the UNSC due to him destroying protected classified military property. But in Recreation, he was offered freedom in exchange for the retrieval of the Epsilon AI while assisted by the Meta, causing Wash to turn against the Red and Blue teams due to Caboose not taking Epsilon to the authorities and keeping him instead and even shoots Lopez and Donut dead. However by Revelation, upon capturing a copy of the Tex AI, The Meta betrays Washington in order to pursue his original goal of gaining the full Alpha AI. Wash is subsequently injured by The Meta and saved by the Red and Blue teams. He fakes his death and joins the Blue Team, wearing Church's armor with his original yellow trim, so as to not be caught by authorities.

In Season 10 it is revealed that Wash essentially replaced Church on the Blue Team to remain incognito, and throughout the season he is loyal to Carolina despite not agreeing with most of her methods, but eventually comes to her rescue on the Director's base alongside the Reds and Blues. In Chapter 6, Wash was shown without his helmet, however only the back of his head was shown, revealing that he has spikey blonde hair.

In Season 11, Wash assumes command of Blue Team as they try living stranded following a shipwreck. After their base is attacked by the Federal Army of Chorus, Wash sacrifices himself and orders Freckles to collapse the cave leading to the New Republic base and is knocked out and captured by Locus seconds later. After being reunited with the other Reds and Blues the following season, Wash helps them in their mission to drive away the mercenaries attacking the planet, entering particular conflicts with Locus, who considers Washington to have lost his value as a soldier.

In Season 15, Wash and Carolina separate from the Reds and Blues to investigate on the death of other Freelancers. They are still reunited with the Reds and Blues and meet the Blues and Reds, with their leader Temple secretly traps them in armor lock mode in a room full of Freelancers who fell victim as well. After days paralyzed, which caused extreme fatigue even caused him to hallucinate, Wash is released by Locus, and due to his hindered mental state is shot in the throat when he wanders into a battlefield. Locus promptly puts him on board his ship, and goes to get Wash medical attention on Chorus. The Shisno Paradox reveals the injury resulted in Wash suffering from cerebral hypoxia, giving him bouts of frustration and short-term memory loss, as well as being unable to recall the events of Season 15. After regrouping with the Reds and Blues, Wash is unaware of his condition until Carolina reveals it to him. Enraged, Wash storms off. Frustrated, the Reds and Blues time travel to prevent Wash from being shot in the first place, causing a temporal paradox that breaks reality.

In Singularity Wash has, as subject of the paradox, had his history rewritten and is left oscillating between the delusional state he was in prior to being shot and the sane man he was after his treatment. Wash's complaining about his non-existent neck wound to Doctor Grey inspired her to commit a massive insurance fraud against the UNSC, splitting the compensation between Wash and herself. Wash used the money to make nonsensical business deals, such as using cannons for funerals. Donut arrives and fixes Wash's oscillation, and explains Chrovos's plan. Washington suggests stopping the paradox, but Genkins steals the time travel gun. The two instead use their memories to travel through the Everwhen, and eventually free the other Reds and Blues from their prison and restore their memories. Wash ultimately decides to undo the final paradox, which would stop the prevention of his injury and restore his brain damage. Though Genkins temporarily stops them by trapping them inside the Labyrinth, the Reds and Blues escape, and travel back in time to stop the final paradox; Wash is subsequently rushed to a hospital on Chorus.

By the time of Zero, Wash's brain damage has been fixed by robotic implants, which also give him to see events seconds before they happen. He and Carolina have also joined the Alliance of Defense, and Wash has attained the rank of Major. He and Carolina oversee the transfer of an alien artifact to a secure facility. The transfer is interrupted by Zero, Phase, and Diesel, who attack and wipe out most of the military personnel and defeat Wash and Carolina in hand-to-hand combat. They attempt to interrogate Washington; when he refuses to give them any information, they use a mysterious dagger to extract the information from him.

In the flashbacks of Season 9 and 10, Washington is shown to be a naive and neurotic rookie, much like the Reds and Blues. However the encounter with Epsilon hardened him, making him a considerably more serious and skilled character throughout The Recollection. Although Washington is not as skilled in combat as higher-ranked freelancers such as Carolina, he is nevertheless a formidable opponent in a fight, managing to take down a UNSC Hornet single-handedly, and battle against the likes of Tex, The Meta, and Locus.

Carolina
Agent Carolina (Jen Brown) is a defective member of Project Freelancer, who was believed dead after The Meta threw her off a cliff after stealing her two AI units, but is revealed to be alive at the end of Season 9. Carolina turns out to have recruited the Reds and Blues to retrieve Epsilon so he could lead her to Project Freelancer's director, who she intends to kill.
During the flashbacks of Seasons 9 and 10, Carolina is revealed to have been the top Freelancer agent until Tex arrived. For being extremely competitive against Tex, even willing to risk the mission's completion in order to beat her rival, Carolina ends up becoming bitter and easily angered, which drives her Freelancer partners away. Still, in spite of initially being obsessed with killing the Director, once Carolina finds him by the end of Season 10, she only confronts Dr. Church and calls out on his behavior, in a way that also reveals to the viewer that the director is Carolina's father. She is a proficient fighter and has many enhancements in her armor, such as active camouflage and speed boost. It is assumed that she still has these armor enhancements, but they are inoperable without an AI to run them.

Alongside Epsilon, Carolina is absent from Season 11, returning halfway through Season 12 to reveal that in her search for Freelancer-based equipment, she uncovered the conspiracy taking place on planet Chorus, leading the Reds and Blues on a mission to expose the mercenaries and the corporation that were keeping the planet in a civil war. In Season 15, Carolina is revealed to have, along with Tex, triggered Temple's wish to take down Project Freelancer and the UNSC, as a fight between both during a capture the flag match in Desert Gulch killed Temple's friend Biff. Even though she was weakened by spending days paralyzed with her armor locked, Carolina helped the Reds and Blues defeat Temple. In The Shisno Paradox Carolina leaves for Chorus to check on the recovery of the hospitalized Washington, but without revealing to him about his brain damage. She eventually rejoins the Reds and Blues and goes with them to the past trying to prevent Wash from getting wounded in the first place.

Chorus War

Locus
A mercenary associated with a band of Space Pirates, Locus (Gray Haddock), whose real name is revealed in Season 14 to be Samuel Ortez, was hired by Charon Industries to play off one of the sides in the Chorus Civil War, the Federal Army of Chorus. He is named after an eponymous suit of armor, and has a cloaking device that allows him to become invisible.

Locus' introduction in season 11 had him spying on the Reds and Blues, and later killing the pilot that dropped off Doc, Donut, and Lopez. Once he sees Felix talking to the group, he decides to recruits soldiers to attack the crash site. In the ensuing battle, he personally incapacitates and captures Donut, Wash, Lopez, and Sarge. In the next season, New Republic leader Kimball reveals to Tucker that Felix and Locus were in fact friends and fought alongside each other, but the war changed them both so much they could not face returning to civilian life. Felix teamed up with the Chorus rebels and, out of rivalry, Locus joined the FAC to finally find out which one of them is the better soldier. However, Felix's betrayal later in the season reveals the last part was a ruse: Locus and Felix were hired to play both sides of the Chorus war to wipe out the population for an organization (Control) that intends to use Chorus for their own purposes.

During Season 13, a portal in a temple reveals a part of Locus' past: the squad in which he and Felix fought found an Alien, Locus refused to kill him, only take it prisoner, which led the commanding officer to yell at Locus, saying him that he was nothing more than a suit of armor and a gun who should follow orders without question. Traumatized by having his values shattered in front of him, Locus decides to become what his superior demanded, a living weapon that carried out all orders regardless of their consequences. Still, once Locus realizes he has become less a soldier than a monster, and discovers Felix was afraid of Locus himself, Locus refuse to aid Felix, leading to the latter's death. Locus vows to the Reds and Blues to amend his wrongs, but proclaims that he will not do it from a cell, while leaving them behind.

In Season 15, making up for his past sins, Locus swore off killing and began seeking ways to use his skills to help others. Approximately ten months later, Locus discovered a refugee colony with their power generator stolen by the Blues and Reds resulting in their deaths. While looking for the terrorists he finds Lopez's head floating in space heading to a black hole while asking for help. Locus joins up with Lopez and Grif to save the Reds and Blues. While Grif distracts the Blues and Reds, Locus saves Washington and Carolina. He then meets up with Sarge to free the rest of the group. After Wash is wounded, Locus takes him aboard his ship to receive medical attention on Chorus. During the next season, Locus tries to contact the Reds and Blues with an urgent message, but Grif, who wanted to avoid anything that could lead to further adventures, crashed the ship before learning what Locus wanted.

Felix
Felix (Miles Luna), real name Isaac Gates, first appears in Season 11, observing the Blue Team and noticing that Locus is nearby. Felix saves Wash from being shot by Locus with a hardlight shield, but is himself hit in the leg. After Locus flees, Doc manages to heal Felix, who reveals he is a mercenary working with the New Republic that is fighting on the planet of Chorus, a planet forgotten about by the UNSC during the war against the aliens, and requires the help of the Reds and Blues. Although reluctant, the Reds and Blues eventually agree to help.

During Season 12, Felix inspects the training Tucker, Simmons, Grif and Caboose provide to the New Republic troops, and reveals while a mercenary, his only payment is on alien technology he hopes to sell in the black market. Once he appears in the Federal Army's compound where the Reds and Blues reunited, Felix reveals himself to be a sadistic, manipulative psychopath, who was working alongside Locus to keep prolonging the war on Chorus for an organization that intends to use Chorus for their own purposes. His intentions are revealed to the New Republic once Tucker records Felix gloating about his plans and broadcasts it to the troops that were fighting on the Chorus capital Armonia.

In Season 13, Felix and Locus decide to even the odds by raiding the UNSC Tartarus, kill the crew members and "recruit" several of its prisoners, including the Counselor and Sharkface. After the Reds and Blues activate the planet's dormant alien technology, Felix learns about the Purge tower, that could kill everyone on Chorus. He goes for the Great Key that could activate the Purge, but Doyle beats him to it. Felix retrieves the Key, only to discover it will only work for Doyle until he dies, leading to an attack on Armonia that kills the General. Felix and Locus then head for the Purge tower, where Wash and Carolina waited. After a long and brutal fight, the Freelancers inform the two that they were simply stalling them, and then the Tartarus is brought down with a tractor beam into the tower, destroying it.

Enraged, Felix flies himself and Locus to the Comm Temple in their damaged Falcon, furiously wanting to kill the Blood Gulch Crew. Locus eventually decides he had enough of Felix and refuses to aid him, leading Simmons and Tucker to blast Felix off the tower. Locus proceeds to pick up the discarded Key and activates the sword, proving the previous wielder was dead.

The Chairman
Chairman Malcolm Hargrove (Jack Lee), also known as Control, is the head of Charon Industries, a company which specializes in military hardware. Hargrove is also the Chairman of the UNSC Oversight Sub-Committee.  He is introduced in Reconstruction through messages exchanged between himself and Director Leonard Church, of Project Freelancer, with the Chairman suspecting him of criminal acts with his experiments, and eventually presses charges against the Director and sends officers to place him under arrest. He returns in Recreation to talk with Washington, striking a deal to free him in exchange for the Epsilon AI.

In the finale of season 12, the Reds and Blues acknowledge his true identity as the leader of the corporation financing the Chorus Civil War. He then receives a threat from them, after which we learn that he is in possession of the Meta's helmet. By the next season, it is further revealed that Charon is selling Alien technology on the black market, and once the Reds and Blues expose Hargrove's crimes, he arrives on Chorus, declaring if he is going down, then so will the inhabitants and the Space Pirates. Hargrove later confronts the Reds and Blues on a video screen aboard the Staff of Charon. Season 15 reveals that Hargrove was defeated and arrested.

Sheila/F.I.L.S.S.
Sheila (Yomary Cruz) is one of the many copies of the F.I.L.S.S. (Freelancer Integrated Logistics and Security System, pronounced "Phyllis", and also voiced by Cruz) AI. In The Blood Gulch Chronicles Sheila appears primarily as the AI of the Blue Team's tank. In seasons 9-10, the original F.I.L.S.S. system is shown running training programs, security and databases. Unlike the Alpha, Sheila/F.I.L.S.S. is not a "smart AI", meaning that she was programmed rather than based on a person. She is usually friendly and cheerful.

In Season 1, Sheila is driven by Caboose, and accidentally kills his teammate, Church, due to a combination of locked-on targeting and disabled friendly fire protocol, before being herself "killed" after Sarge orders a bombing. Tex fixes Sheila and attacks Red Base, but is then, this becomes a running joke in the series. Sheila initially shows some indications of liking Caboose. However, in the middle of Season 2, she falls in love with Lopez, much to Caboose's dislike. Later, the two attempt to lead a robot revolution against the humans in response to the abuse they have received from constantly being blown up and possessed by ghosts. When Church goes "back in time", he attempts to stop himself from being killed. When he encounters Sheila she calls herself F.I.L.S.S. This confuses Church, she then asks if he would like her to change her name to Sheila, which she does. It is also revealed that the robot revolution idea stemmed from Church's attempt to intervene. After O'Malley kidnaps Lopez, she starts assisting the teams again.

Sheila remains behind on Blood Gulch while the Reds and Blues leave to pursue O'Malley through the teleporter. After a brief conversation with a "time-traveling" Church, Sheila powers down. She is the source of the distress signal that the Reds hear in Season 3. A deleted scene from Season 4 confirms that she sent out the distress signal with a disguised voice. In addition, all of the Reds except Sarge see her drive past Red Base. When Sarge demotes Simmons for his talk about "imaginary" tanks, she helps Simmons attempt his revenge on the Reds, and is unable to recognize the team as her enemies due to faltering memory units. In a deleted scene from Season 4, she expresses anger when Church collects all the vehicles available to the Blue Base in Blood Gulch, while Church perceives her reaction as jealousy.

In Season 5, Church notes that Sheila has been acting more aggressive lately and saying "random threatening things." They suspect that O'Malley could be possessing her and she is shut down. Tex explained that the tank was too damaged to be reactivated, so they transfer Sheila's AI into the ship that Sister had arrived in. She is pleasantly surprised by the roominess of her new home, and later tells Caboose that O'Malley has moved into the Blue leader (Captain Flowers). Her tank body is then taken over by the AI Gamma. Later they link the ship up to the tank and she locks Gamma behind a firewall.

Caboose tells the other Blues in  that Andy knew Sheila from a previous encounter. The Season 4 commentary states that Andy was originally to be Sheila's ex-boyfriend, but this idea never went used. Sheila is believed to be destroyed when Andy explodes inside the ship in the final episode of the Blood Gulch Chronicles. However, it is revealed in Reconstruction that Sheila survived the explosion and is still present within the crashed ship. As a result of the explosion, she is damaged and functions at minimal capacity, stuttering when speaking. Later in Relocated Caboose is seen taking parts from the ship. In Revelation she occupies an abandoned Freelancer facility where the Reds and Blues travel. After constantly being called Sheila, she begins to respond to that name as well.

In Project Freelancer, F.I.L.S.S. assisted the Director on the flagship Mother of Invention and various other freelancer bases. She appears to be a close companion of the Freelancers as they greet her when they return from their missions. One subroutine becomes Sheila the tank. In Season 10, in the present day, the same abandoned facility from earlier had become Director's hideout. There she spends her days constantly repeating a video of Allison. After Carolina and Church left the Director, he ordered F.I.L.S.S. to delete everything, including her, except the video. Before deletion, they both express the honor of serving each other.

In Season 12's finale, F.I.L.S.S. is shown to be functional and working for Chairman Hargrove, though sounding more depressed and reluctant in her duties. In the conclusion of Season 13, F.I.L.S.S is discovered by the Reds and Blues on the ship Staff of Charon, where she reveals she has been working under duress, and aids the Reds and Blues in their plot to expose Hargrove.

Sharkface
Sharkface (David Jennison) first appears in Season 9, Chapter 13. In the following chapter, when the Freelancers attack a building, he is ordered to lead a squad up to the vault to kill the Freelancers. Carolina and Washington are about to leave the vault when the door is opened and the Flame Soldier appears. The two Freelancers, confused by his bold entrance, are forced to take cover as he begins to fire a flamethrower. After a tough fight, Carolina, jumps onto a Banshee suspended from the ceiling, tosses a grenade and kicks off it. The grenade explodes sending the Banshee flying into the Flame Soldier. To their surprise, the Flame Soldier takes the hit and begins to get up, but Carolina throws a Gravity Hammer at his head, rendering him unconscious.

In the first episode of Season 13, Sharkface is seen for a brief moment in a prison cell on a giant prison transport ship, the Tartarus. Later in the episode, he is seen getting released and recruited by Felix and Locus, due to his past experience with the Freelancers. The Insurrection Flame Soldier, now known as Sharkface due to the tattoos of his old Insurrection personality and the left side of his face being covered by scar tissue, explains to the Counselor that they left him for dead, dropped a building on him, and killed all his friends. He is also seen spray painting his helmet and gun with the gun receiving the shark decal instead of his helmet. The Counselor has numerous therapeutic sessions with Sharkface where he vividly expressed his hatred of the Freelancers. He successfully defeats Carolina after Epsilon fails to maintain her armor upgrades and constantly butts heads with Felix. He puts himself on a warpath against Carolina and Wash which gets him killed. After being defeated by Carolina, he vowed that he will hunt Agents Carolina and Washington, no matter what they do to him. With that said, he is swiftly executed by Agent Washington and Vannessa Kimball. His corpse is destroyed as Doyle blows up Armonia.

The Counselor
Counselor Aiden Price (Asaf Ronen) was a high-ranking member of the Freelancer Project. The Counselor first appears in a flashback during Part 4 of Recovery One, where he interrogates Agent Washington about the failure of the Epsilon AI and informs him he is a candidate for Recovery. His next appearance is in Reconstruction, where he appears on a monitor and interrogates Pvt. Henderson before speaking to Agent Washington about The Meta. He also speaks briefly with Washington in Chapter 19 and attempts to negotiate with The Meta. He is also seen during a flashback in Recreation debriefing Donut after his transfer from Blood Gulch. He typically speaks in a very soft voice, and tries to calm those he is speaking to. The Counselor appears in the flashback portions of Season 9 and Season 10 where he frequently advises against some of the Director's more erratic actions, but is usually ignored, the Director even going so far as saying "Shut up Counselor".

In Prologue (the first episode of Season 13), it is revealed the Counselor is being held on the UNSC prison ship Tartarus in transit for transport to an unknown facility. When the ship is raided by Felix and Locus, he offers his knowledge of the Freelancers project, showing bitterness to Agents Washington and Carolina. In episode 18 the Counselor is killed when the Tartarus crash lands on Chorus.

Kimball
Vanessa Kimball (Lindsay Jones) is the idealist leader of the Chorusian New Republic, who takes in Simmons, Grif, Tucker and Caboose after the Federal Army attacks the Reds and Blues. When Felix lies to her and tells her that the Reds and Blues were killed, he manages to convince Kimball to go to the capital Armonia with her soldiers. However, they end up trapped inside the capital by the Federal Army, only stopping once the Reds and Blues reveal Felix's confession of his true intentions and allegiance to Control, which even had him bragging about playing Kimball, to her disgust. Kimball and Doyle both order their troops to stand down.
In the next season, both continue to bicker regarding the way to lead the armies in their fight against Charon, until Doyle confesses he admires Vanessa's courage, and then the General's sacrifice inspires Kimball to convince the factions to solve their differences. She leads the attack on the Communication Temple that would allow the Reds and Blues to expose Charon to the universe.

In Season 15, Kimball is revealed to have become the president of a united Chorus, currently under siege by UNSC troops.

Doyle
General Donald Doyle (Gray Haddock) was the leader of the Federal Army of Chorus. Originally a secretary for a brigadier general, he became the FAC leader after previous leaders either left or died during the Chorus Civil War. He is shown to be extremely cowardly when it came to combat situations. Still, he decided to retrieve an energy sword that would allow the mercenaries to kill all of Chorus, and later sacrifices himself by manually attaching an explosive to Armonia's nuclear reactor in an attempt to kill all space pirates who had invaded the Chorus capital. In season 15 a memorial hospital was built and named General Doyle General Hospital.

The Lieutenants
Once the New Republic decides to have Caboose, Grif, Simmons, and Tucker instruct their troops, they are named captains and given each a squad to lead. At a certain point, each has to promote one soldier to be their lieutenants in a rescue mission.

From Caboose's Blue Team comes Lt. John Elizabeth Andersmith "Smith" (Ryan Haywood), a disciplined and blindingly loyal recruit, who believes that Caboose is an extremely wise and great leader, shocking the others.

Even if the sycophantic Matthews (Kyle Taylor) attempts to become the Orange Team's choice in the rescue mission, Grif promotes Lt. Antoine Bitters (Brandon Farmahini), who, like his superior, has a lazy attitude, who Grif likes for being a "total maverick".

Simmons' Red Team only has women, something that bothers him (due to his inability to speak to women). He chooses the one who makes him the less nervous, Lt. Katie Jensen (Barbara Dunkelman), who like Simmons is intellectual, loyal and socially awkward, although she went as far as choking in her own saliva when attempting to introduce herself. Jensen speaks with a heavy lisp, and in Season 13 turns out to be a dangerous driver who constantly destroys vehicles.

After Tucker's Green Team is mostly killed in a mission, the only survivor is the one Tucker resents the most, and thus earns a promotion, Lt. Charles Palomo (Kerry Shawcross). Like Tucker, Palomo is immodest and perverted, although he manages to eventually gain the affection of Jensen, and by Season 15 both are dating.

Santa
Santa (Adam Ellis), named so by Caboose for being red and "bearing gifts", is an alien AI construct who inhabits and guards the ancient temples of Chorus. He first appears when Tucker activates his sword before the Temple of Arms, knowing it was a key built by its creators that could activate the temples. Santa then deactivates the facility, and  proceeds to test anyone who entered the temples with illusions that show their greatest fears in search for "a true warrior of  mental clarity and strength", which turns out to be Caboose, who is not intimidated by Santa's ordeal. After Caboose exits, Santa introduces himself as an AI left behind to protect gifts from his creators, which range from alien weaponry to communications centers. At first he refuses to take part in the Chorus Civil War, but eventually backs the natives after realizing that the Space Pirates intend on selling the technology.

In Season 15, Santa is revealed to have become an assistant to President Kimball, checking on whoever visits her to see if they lie.

Dr. Grey 
Dr. Emily Grey (Arryn Zech) is a surgeon originally in the Federal Army of Chorus, who in spite of remarkable medical skills is mentally unstable, always talking in a cheerful manner even when discussing morbid subjects. Introduced recovering Washington following the battle that led to his capture, Grey is eventually transported along with the Blood Gulch Crew by getting caught in the radius of a Teleportation Cube utilized by Carolina. There, she treats Carolina's wound, and helps the group learn more about Locus and Felix's plans by questioning a pirate who follows the group through torture and mutilation.

A month later, as the civil war is changed to a fight between Chorus and Charon Industries, Dr. Grey goes with Epsilon and Carolina to gain more info on a nearby alien temple. She is present after Caboose manages to uncover the AI inside the temple, even ordering Freckles to kill the pirates who appear after the group, and as Doc is discovered in a cave. Upon their return to Armonia,  Grey quickly becomes interested in Doc's split personality and chases him around the city to perform electroshock therapy on him. Later on, the Space Pirates attack the city, forcing Grey to take refuge inside the hospital. As the pirates attack the hospital, Grey is luckily saved by Smith, Jensen, Palomo, and Bitters, who inform her that they are evacuating the city. Along with the lieutenants, she infiltrates Crash Site Alpha and activate the tractor beam that brings down the Tartarus, destroying it and the Purge Temple on the impact.

In Season 15, Dr. Grey is revealed to be the head surgeon of General Doyle General Hospital, patching up Jax Jones and giving his boss Dylan Andrews the name of the UNSC diplomat that could help her arrange a meeting with Kimball. Grey also treats Washington's neck wound, and in the next season discusses the resulting injuries with Carolina, who had become worried by her partner's memory lapses.

Blues And Reds

Temple 
Mark Temple (Andrew Matthews) is Church's counterpart, and the leader of the Blues and Reds, the group attacking the UNSC. After his friend Biff (Mac Blake), a Grif equivalent, was accidentally killed during a capture the flag game featuring Carolina and Tex,  he swore revenge upon the UNSC and Project Freelancer. He started killing everyone involved in the project, with agents in particular being lured to a secret room where Temple locked them in their armor, a fate Temple bestows on Wash and Carolina while revealing his vendetta.

Unlike Church, Temple is a caring, kind, and capable leader with much respect for others, but they are both terrible shots with the sniper rifle. In reality, Temple is a manipulative and sadistic individual more than willing to murder anyone who gets in his way, while Church was willing to sacrifice himself on numerous occasions (and actually has, twice). Temple is revealed to have planned to use a specialized drill that runs on temporal power to destroy the UNSC headquarters, unaware that doing so would endanger the entire planet, and possibly the universe, due to breaking the laws of physics and possibly opening a tear in reality. When confronted by the Reds and Blues with this information, he stubbornly refuses to believe it, insisting that they simply wish to keep him from destroying the UNSC and achieving the vengeance he seeks for the death of his longtime friend Biff. Temple is knocked unconscious by Tucker, and is seen in a mid-credits scene imprisoned with the surviving Blues and Reds.

Buckey 
Buckey (Dallas Reid) is Tucker's counterpart in the Blues and Reds. Much like Tucker, Buckey is extremely perverted, even having his own version of Tucker's "Bow Chicka Bow Wow!" catchphrase, "A-Boom Chicka Wah Wah!" After the Reds and Blues are captured, Buckey takes Tucker's sword, despite knowing it only works for Tucker. When the Reds and Blues try to stop Loco's machine, Buckey goes into a one-on-one battle with Tucker which end with Tucker knocking Buckey unconscious and recovering his sword. Buckey is seen in a mid-credits scene imprisoned with the surviving Blues and Reds.

Loco 
Loco (Kirk Johnson) is Caboose's Blues and Reds counterpart, with a name alluding to locomotive to contrast the original being the last wagon. Loco is like Caboose in almost every way, even having the same intelligence. Loco also has a knack for engineering, according to Temple. He is also the only member of the Blues and Reds to actually like the Reds and Blues, forming a deep friendship with Caboose. Loco also creates a time machine/laser drill that will cause a black hole that will destroy Earth. After activating the machine, Loco gets Caboose batteries to fix Freckles, but is accidentally shot by Temple. Loco gives Caboose the batteries, before revealing that his machine will allow Caboose to say goodbye to Church. Loco then dies of his wounds. The Shisno Paradox reveals that he had gained the knowledge to build the time machine from Chrovos under unknown circumstances, as part of his plan to destroy the timeline.

Surge 
Colonel Surge (Kent Williams) is Sarge's Blues and Reds counterpart. While they are similar in personality, they have a differing taste in weapons, with Surge preferring a railgun as opposed to a shotgun. During the Blues and Reds invasion of Earth, Surge is the most concerned with killing the Reds and Blues. After Loco's machine is activated, Surge and Sarge get into a one-on-one battle. Sarge tries to get Surge to turn against Temple, but accidentally causes Surge to fall into an incinerator.

Gene 
Gene (Sorola) is Simmons' Blues and Reds counterpart, named as in–joke to Gene Simmons. Unlike the other Blues and Reds, Gene is identical to Simmons in every way, with even their voices being the same. After Loco activates his machine, Gene, now with a gold visor, attacks Grif and Simmons. Grif is at first unable to tell them apart, but gets Gene to reveal himself by asking the question "Why are we here" which Gene responses with (We need to stop these evil guys, that's why!) while Simmons response with (We don't know why we're here. It's still one of life's great mysteries, isn't it?). Grif promptly shoots Gene, who stumble over a catwalk and is left hanging precariously over a lava flow.

Cronut 
Cronut (Luna) is Donut's counterpart, also named after a pastry. Like Donut, Cronut often nearly dies, and has a dislike of his armor being called pink, instead preferring "reddish-white."  Cronut also frequently makes innuendos. When the Blues and Reds arrive on Earth, Cronut and Lorenzo are sent to kill the Reds and Blues in a tank. Tucker quickly decapitates Lorenzo, and causes the tank to explode with Cronut still inside. It is later revealed that Cronut managed to survive, and was imprisoned along with the other surviving Blues and Reds.

Lorenzo 
Lorenzo (Burnie Burns) is Lopez's counterpart, a robot that can only speak Italian. When the Blues and Reds arrive on Earth, Lorenzo and Cronut are sent in a tank to kill them. Tucker jumps on the tank and decapitates Lorenzo, who was serving as the gunner, and kicks his head into the distance while Lorenzo yells out threats. Lorenzo's body is destroyed when the tank explodes.

Doc
Medical Officer Frank "Doc" Dufresne (Matt Hullum), nicknamed as such because Church could not pronounce his surname, is a medic first sent to Blood Gulch to treat both armies, despite the lack of medical skill that he often displays. He is not a qualified doctor, having failed medical school at Jamaica State, and his lack of medical knowledge is apparent. In one case he rubs Caboose's neck with aloe vera to treat a bullet wound in the foot, and he agrees with Grif's using CPR to treat the bullet wound to the head. He also has no idea what his medical tool (portrayed by Halos Plasma Pistol) does.

Doc is also a pacifist of the most extreme kind, and tries to avoid doing or even saying anything that would seem remotely aggressive or competitive. As revealed in the bonus material on the Season 3 DVD, this pacifism had caused him to be released from the Red Army before the events of The Blood Gulch Chronicles, thereby necessitating the draft that forced Grif into military service. The profile also states he is the only person in history to enlist in an army as a 'conscientious objector'. Doc's incompetence drew the ire of both teams, leading him to hide in a cave. There O'Malley found Doc and possessed him, and the personality clashes – the aggressive megalomaniac AI against the meek apologetic host – lead to frequent arguments between O'Malley and Doc. After going into hiding following O'Malley's defeat at the end of Season 3, Doc returns in  because Church needed a medical assessment of Tucker. In Episode 77, O'Malley leaves Doc after the Reds, unaware of his presence, contact Command via radio. Free of O'Malley, Doc continues to aid Tucker, who was in fact pregnant with an alien, and hang along with the Blues,  providing Sister with a physical and later being held captive along with her by O'Malley's new host Captain Flowers.

In Reconstruction, Doc only had a cameo in the Sponsor Cut of an episode, where he was called to assist a comatose Caboose, but Washington's team had already departed before Doc arrived. Doc is next seen in Revelation when Simmons, as Washington's prisoner, calls for a medic. Command sends the nearest one, Doc, who is soon attacked by Washington and also taken prisoner, being ordered to check The Meta's vitals. In the finale of Revelation, Doc helps treat Washington after the battle, and manages to escape with the Red and Blue teams.

In Season 10 it is revealed that Doc eventually returned to Valhalla, where he revived Donut. After Church and Carolina leave to kill the Director, the others are left at the base when Doc talks about how close they have all become and the group is encouraged to go find Church and Carolina. Doc, who is excited they are going on another adventure, goes to pack medical equipment for the trip. He is then left behind by the Reds and Blues who leave in Hornets. However, Doc returns in Season 11, along with Donut and Lopez. He assists Grif with researching the teleportation grenades found on the crashed ship. When the two present their findings to Sarge, Grif accidentally throws one at Doc and he disappears. Doc is not seen for the rest of the season, and only Lopez seems to notice his disappearance.

Only in the 13th season Doc made his return, stating that after Grif threw a "Future Cube" at him, he entered a sort of "other dimension" until emerging in the cave where Caboose, Dr. Grey, and Tucker found him. When Doc discovered that no one noticed his disappearance, an angry split personality based on O'Malley emerged and violently beat Tucker, until Dr. Grey knocked him out. Doc, manifesting this O'Malley persona, fights alongside the Reds and Blues during the final battle against Hargrove's forces.

Doc returns in Season 15, revealing himself as an old acquaintance of the Blues and Reds before he met the Blood Gulch troopers. Doc defects to the Blues and Reds, due to the Reds and Blues treating him poorly, but changes his mind upon realizing Temple's plan, leading Doc to be imprisoned, and then freed by Tucker. In The Shisno Paradox Doc's betrayal earns him the scorn of Grif, even if Donut's introduction of a time travel adventure has both paired. Doc tries to convince Grif of using time travel to save lives, but Grif only thinks of pizza, even traveling back to ancient Italy trying to teach the natives to make it once the dish turns out to no longer exist in the present. Doc admits he became a medic because of his failure to save his brother, but Grif passes out. When he wakes up, Grif gives Doc the time machine, saying that pizza can wait. Huggins suddenly warns Grif not to do it, and Doc reveals he is under the control of his O'Malley personality, before stranding Huggins and Grif in the past. Doc/O'Malley is later commanded to kill Donut for betraying Chrovos, resulting in a battle though time that ended in 21st century Chicago which he ended up getting blown off a building with a grenade.

In season 17 it is revealed by Donut that he died from the fall, though this is later revealed as untrue when Doc regains his memories in the Everwhen. Doc regains control of his body once more, and escapes being trapped in the Labyrinth by Genkins. Doc arrives at the Labyrinth's entrance, offering to help Chrovos and Donut. Doc, while trying to free Washington, is confronted by a manifestation of his O’Malley personality. Doc merges with the O'Malley personality with him, rescuing Washington.

Doc was originally envisioned as a journalist-type character but was changed to a medic when a war journalist was deemed "too close" to the then ongoing War in Iraq. The original plan for Doc's character, as noted by the Rooster Teeth crew, was simply to provide a vessel for O'Malley to jump into, and also to display his pacifism. Matt Hullum notes going through several different accents for the character, such as Cockney, French and Australian, before settling on his own voice to use, as he was unsure which direction to take the character.

 Cosmic Powers 
 Atlus Arcadium Rex 
Atlus Arcadium Rex (SungWon Cho) is the leader of the Cosmic Powers.

 Genkins 
Genkins (Ricco Fajardo) is one of the Cosmic Powers, a group of A.I. disguised as a pantheon of gods that were created by Chrovos. Genkins is a trickster, known for cracking jokes and lying and is almost always seen with a golf club, that Atlus later gives to Caboose, something that leaves Genkins distraught. Along with the rest of the Cosmic Powers, Genkins had overthrown Chrovos and trapped him. Genkins later grows bored with pretending to be a God and desires to be one for real. To this end, he allies with Chrovos who promised him with such power if he aided him in causing the Reds and Blues to destroy the timeline. Genkins helps deteriorate Wash's mental state, erases pizza from existence, and murders Huggins to prevent her from stopping the Reds and Blues from destroying the timeline.

When the paradox takes effect, Genkins possesses Church in the alternate timeline most of the Reds and Blues are trapped in, and tries to lead them to create more paradoxes to free Chrovos. Genkins jumps across the timeline as well, creating more paradoxes. Despite Genkins’ efforts to stop Washington and Donut from rescuing the Reds and Blues from the Everwhen, they succeed; Genkins is promptly attacked and beaten up by Caboose for possessing Church.

Genkins then attempts to stop the Reds and Blues from fixing the timeline, only to fail consistently. Donut convinces Genkins that Chrovos will betray and abandon him, leading to Genkins betraying Chrovos and stealing most of her power. With this new power, Genkins strips the Reds and Blues of their ability to time travel. When the Reds and Blues use the time portals to impale Genkins with his own golf club (which had been taken by Caboose), Genkins traps them in the Labyrinth. When Doc and Donut free them, Genkins is briefly trapped in the Labrynth, though he quickly escapes. Genkins snaps and goes insane, deciding to use a black hole to travel back to the beginning of time and become a god. Successfully doing so, Genkins is revealed to be Chrovos; Chrovos had forgotten her origin as Genkins. The Reds and Blues then instruct Huggins to inform the Cosmic Powers about Genkins's treachery and to trap him alongside his future self.

 Chrovos 
Chrovos is a primordial being who existed when the universe was created with the power to control time. He is the main antagonist of Red vs Blue season 16 & 17 while also a catalyst behind the events of season 15.

 Kalirama the Undying 
Kalirama is the goddess of death and wife/sister to Atlus. She is first seen when the Reds and Blues travel back in time to get pizza at the beginning of season 16, where she attacks the group and destroys the pizzeria, seemingly in an attempt to stop Donut, as he was the one who Chrovos used to reach the Reds and Blues.

 Huggins 
Huggins is a sentient Light Being that appeared in season 16. She, alongside her brother Muggins, were affiliated with the Cosmic Powers and were tasked to keep an eye on the Reds and Blues. After the simulation troopers escaped from Kalirama by a time portal, she followed Grif and Doc into sixth-century Italy and failed to stop him from giving Doc the gun, not knowing he was taken over by his other personality. She later joined Grif to find Sister, who was in England with Tucker and slowly became friends.

After the Reds and Blues met the Cosmic Powers she was ordered to watch over them and finds out that they are choosing to disobey the Cosmic Powers' request and travel back in time and stop Wash from getting shot. Outraged and feeling betrayed by Grif, Huggins rushes off to warn the Cosmic Powers about their betrayal but Genkins stops her by summoning a black hole that sucks her inside killing her. In season 17 it is revealed she survived the black hole and ended nearby a Red sun like object.

 Muggins 
Muggins is a sentient Light Being that is affiliated to the Cosmic Powers who first appeared in season 16. He is also the brother of Huggins.

 Labyrinth 
Labyrinth was an AI designed to make illusions to anyone that was brought there (specifically for people trying to free Chrovos. Except of course, "The chosen one") But Genkins lied to Labyrinth by telling him the Reds and Blues were trying to free Chrovos.

Donut and Doc went in to try to free the Reds and Blues. In Washington's Room, O'Malley tried to get Doc to let him out. Instead, Doc decided to break his oath. In Carolina's Room, it was revealed that Carolina's fear was her old self. When Carolina defeated her fear, Labyrinth revealed himself and Donut tried to tell him Genkins was trying to break Chrovos free. When Genkins came in, Labyrinth was holding his Golf Club. Genkins them kicked him off of the edge into the Black Hole. When Genkins falls into the Black Hole, Labyrinth was actually alive.

 Burnstorm 
Burnstorm is the master builder of the Cosmos. He created both the Labyrinth and the AI, who inhabits it.

 Alliance of Defense 

 Shatter Squad 

 Agent One 
One (Fiona Nova) is a member of the Shatter Squad and one of the main protagonists of Red vs Blue Zero.

 Agent East 
East (Jennifer K. Tidwell) is a member of the Shatter Squad and West's daughter.

 Agent West 
West (Andre Ouellette) is the leader of the Shatter Squad and East's father.

 Agent Axel 
Axel (Jeb Aguilar-Kendrick) is a member of the Shatter Squad and seems to know Zero.

 Agent Raymond 
Raymond (Noel Wiggins) is a member of the Shatter Squad who is the new member and tech expert.

 Viper Squad 

 Zero 
Zero is the leader of the Viper Squad.

 Phase 
Phase is a member of the Viper Squad.

 Diesel
Diesel is a member of the Viper Squad.

Recurring characters

 Andy 
Built by Tex, Andy, full name Andrew D. Kaboom, (Nathan Zellner) is the short-tempered, rude, and vulgar bomb. Andy often expresses a desire to detonate himself to solve a problem, much to the worry the teams, who attempt to calm him down. Andy is apparently self-conscious about his weight. In , after O'Malley repeatedly calls him "bowling ball", Andy asks Caboose if this is true, claiming that he has been working out. When Sarge steals Andy, he remarks that Andy is much lighter than the last time he tried to pick him up, and Andy is relieved that someone has noticed. Since Andy was built from parts of an old robot, he is able to speak. He also understands the Alien's language, and rest of the group use him to act as a translator. In , the Reds steal Andy to translate a recording for them, which is stored in Lopez, but is in Spanish.

Later, he was taken by O'Malley, then possessing Captain Flowers, but was left in the caves with Lopez after Flowers learned enough Alien language to get by. The Red team returns to pick him up in Episode 100 and plant him in the ship as a contingency plan. They order him to detonate if O'Malley tries to escape in the ship. O'Malley does so, so Andy detonates, seemingly killing everyone on board. Andy's fate is expanded upon somewhat in the Chapter 5 of Reconstruction. Andy did explode, but while the blast did not destroy him, it caused major damage to the ship. Andy's fate after the crash landing is unknown, though he makes a cameo appearance in Season 9 and Season 11 in the Epsilon unit and on a recording respectively.

In the Season 4 DVD commentary, the series creators stated that they originally wanted to explain Andy's rudeness by making him bitter about being rejected by Sheila, but it was never incorporated into the series.

 Alien 

Appearing for the first time at the end of Season 3, the Alien (voiced by Nathan Zellner) is a navy alien who scared Church out of his body after it wiped out Lopez's robot army single-handedly. This prompts the Blues to attempt to hunt him down, but only to lose to a series of humiliating defeats. Even Tex is cut down seconds after attempting to attack the Alien, and, like Church, is forced to flee her body. Eventually, however, Caboose manages to befriend the Alien, who had found him unpalatable after biting him once. Conversely, the Alien has a strong odor to the Blues, who describe the smell with a series of unpleasant comparisons.

The Alien has a habit of staying crouched, and its language appears to consist entirely of "blarg" and "honk". It seems to understand English, as it responds to other characters when they speak English, but it is unable to speak English itself. The Blues suggest a variety of silly names for the Alien including "Crunch-bite", "Fluffy", and "Honk-Honk". Gary later claims that the Alien is a member of the species that built him, though this later proves to be a lie.

The Alien reveals in the episodes  and  that he was on a quest to retrieve the sword that Tucker had discovered so that he could save his race from extinction. When the Alien first spots Tucker with the sword, he begins beat Tucker to a pulp relentlessly, upset that Tucker had discovered the sword first, as the sword only works for its original finder. The Alien consequently forces Tucker to join him on his quest, threatening to kill everyone otherwise. In , when the team reaches the temple in the Great Freezing Plains, the Alien has Tucker use the sword to unlock the gates to an alien ship. The Alien takes off in the ship, but he is almost immediately shot down and killed by Wyoming.

In , Tucker complains that the Alien is always standing over him when he awakes. Tex assumes that the Alien is simply obsessing over the sword. However, Andy accidentally reveals that the Alien's race reproduces by implanting parasitic embryos in other beings. Soon after, Tucker gives birth to the "baby" or Junior who is heard off-camera speaking in higher-pitched "honks" and "blargs". In , Tucker explains that the Alien's prophecy concerning the sword providing salvation for the Aliens did not fail with his death; instead, Junior, the son of Tucker and the Alien, is the intended savior of the Alien race.

In Revelation, it was revealed that the Alien's claims of a "prophecy" was all a ruse. The entire plot of the Blood Gulch Chronicles was a simulation battle test for Freelancers, in this case, specifically for Tex.

 Grunts and Red Zealot 
The Grunts (voiced by Rooster Teeth's members with altered pitches) are a group of eternally respawning Reds and Blues originally from Battle Creek. Initially engaged in Capture the Flag, the group parodies the multiplayer mode of Halo and the stereotypical behaviors of online Halo gamers, using terms like "rocket whore," "camper", and "noob." Once a match ends and everyone dies, they all inexplicably come back to life and immediately start another match. They downright worship the flag, with one of them in particular, The Red Zealot (Burnie Burns) having a far more religious mindset than his comrades do, and his fast-paced speech consists almost completely of Biblical-type quotes and religion all pertaining to flags, often speaking about crusades and promised lands during battles.

Sarge and Caboose first encounter the Grunts near the beginning of Season 3. They become held up in the group's endless firefights, but eventually escape with Simmons' help. Simmons later teleports the group to Sidewinder and convinces them to attack O'Malley by claiming that he has their flag, but they are caught in the explosion with the rest of the characters. The Red Zealot later teams up with O'Malley after being separated from the other Grunts, having been convinced the rogue AI is the guardian of the Holy Temple. O'Malley, Doc, and Lopez find him irritating, but tolerate him because he performs menial tasks without complaint. The Zealot is killed by Tucker shortly after he finds the energy sword. Later on, the Grunts teams are seen working together to guard the temple in the Great Freezing Plains, but they still exchange trash talk with each other over armor color. They are all soon wiped out by Tex.

In Season 15, the Grunts are shown under the service of Temple. After Wash is shot in a firefight, Caboose proceeds to attack the Grunts in a rage, eventually forcing them to retreat.

 Other Alien 
When Captain Flowers returned as O'Malley's new host, he brought with him a new alien partner, referred to as the Other Alien on his DVD profile. In Episode 97 it was revealed that the Other Alien is seeking the original Alien for unknown reasons, and it revived Captain Flowers to assist him. The pair of them then begin searching for Junior as well. Flowers is working with O'Malley, Vic Jr. and Wyoming to exploit the Alien's race, however Flowers' dialogue with Vic Jr. reveals that the Other Alien is unaware of this fact. In Reconstruction, when Washington and the Blues were looking over the footage from the crashed Pelican, a door is heard opening and Tex says "Wait, where are they going? Close the hatch." And the Alien, and Junior were not found on the ship, implying that the Other Alien escaped with Junior to safety.

 Smith Smith (Jack Pattillo) is one of the Aliens working with the soldier known as C.T., and he appears to be second in command. On his first appearance he is disturbed by the arrival of Sarge, Grif and Caboose. In Recreation Chapter 18 he beats down Jones in retaliation for shooting Epsilon-Church, and when C.T. flees with Epsilon-Church, Smith gives chase, but is taken out when C.T. destroys his vehicle. He survives, however, and is seen standing in front of the temple at the end of the scene. Later in Revelation, he is seen, along with the other aliens, worshipping Epsilon-Church. He is eventually killed along with the rest of the aliens by Washington and The Meta.

 Allison Allison Church (Lindsay Hicks) was the Director's loved one that had died in a war, whose physical appearance in Season 10 marks the first character portrayed by a live action actor instead of an animation. Her death has haunted the Director ever since then and when the Alpha AI was created the memory of her was so strong it created a 'shadow' of her Which gave The Director the idea of fragmenting the Alpha). This 'shadow' was put in a robotic body, given the codename Tex, retaining the memories of Allison. The Director remembered Allison for her failure to survive and therefore, Tex is always destined to fail, no matter how close she may be to victory.

In Season 10, Tex and Carolina were about to fight in the training room, when the Director notices. The Director, worried about Tex, called out "No! Allison!". This caused all the AIs in the area to begin muttering 'Allison' due to them also having memories of Allison from the Alpha. Later in the season, Washington was implanted with Epsilon. As Epsilon's memories were also from the Alpha, when Wash was given Epsilon, he immediately began having flash memories of a conversation the Director had with Allison before she went off to war.

In the epilogue of "Season 10," Carolina talks to Epsilon-Church about her mother. She says her mother was gone a lot, and it seemed like she always had important things to do, but her mother never said goodbye. Carolina explains that her mother disliked goodbyes because the person wasn't really gone, they just weren't there right now. This interaction strongly implies that Allison is indeed Carolina's mother, and—as implied by her green eyes and the Director's last words to her, "You were my greatest creation"—that Leonard Church is her father.

 Siris Siris (Christopher Sabat), full name Mason Wu,  appears in Episodes 9, 10 and 11 of Season 14, as part of a three-part story centered around Locus and Felix before the events of the Chorus trilogy. He is a bounty hunter working with Locus and Felix to apprehend criminals and bring them to custody as a way to make money to support his wife, Megan. He aids them in the capture of Gabriel Lozano, son of mafia boss Reuben Lozano, and later finds out that his criminal record was erased. When Felix suggests holding Gabriel for ransom for more than he was initially worth, Siris objects at first, but reluctantly accepts. When Reuben threatens to kill the bounty hunters (or their loved ones, should they escape), disowns Gabriel, and reveals he knows their hiding location, Siris attempts to back out of the mission to defend his family, but ultimately stays, assisting them in killing Reuben and his henchmen. The very next morning, the three decide to pawn Reuben's limousine to cover the original equipment costs. He is the sniper on the team, and is in charge of surveillance and support.

 Interstellar Daily 

 Dylan Andrews 
Dylan Andrews (Anna Margaret Hollyman) is an investigative journalist for the Interstellar Daily, who while reporting on attacks seemingly caused by the Reds and Blues, does not believe the Blood Gulch Crew did them, due to having previously written an article (shown in Season 12) about how the Reds and Blues, along with Carolina and Washington, took down Project Freelancer and their subsequent pardon. Her search for the truth on what apparently turned the Reds and Blues from hapless heroes to cold-blooded criminals is the main focus of Season 15. In her investigation that starts on Blood Gulch, where Dylan removes VIC from his mainframe promising to delete him after he helped her, Dylan meets the Reds and Blues, helps them find the true perpetrators, the Blues and Reds, and is apprehended by Loco and Temple once she finds out they have ulterior motives. She is eventually freed and helps the Blood Gulch Crew in the final battle against the Blues and Reds.

At the beginning of the Shisno Paradox Dylan and Jax remain behind on the island to clear the Reds and Blues name with the police, as the UNSC still believes they are terrorists. She later calls Carolina to inform that the soldiers have seemingly time travel due to the discovery of ancient art pieces inspired by the Reds and Blues.

 Jax Jonez 
Jax Jonez (Joe Nicolosi) is a film school student brought by his uncle, Interstellar Daily editor Carlos Trabka (Bill Wise), to be Dylan's new cameraman. However, instead of just doing his job, Jax is constantly trying out new filming techniques and forgetting things. He claims he is good at accidentally finding things that "advance the plot." After being captured by Temple, he is shot in the knee when he angers him. Still, Jax participates in the final battle against the Blues and Reds.

In the Shisno Paradox, Jax is directing a film about the events of Season 15, whose production is troubled by the Reds and Blues’ time traveling shenanigans. Jax is depicted here as having become a deranged, mood swinging prima donna who threatens his crew, particularly his producer Kohan Wooter (a caricature of Rooster Teeth producer Koen Wooten, who even provides the voice). Jax eventually bankrupts the film when he uses time travel to add in famous film actors from the past, and is hit with a hammer by Atlus when trying to get a time travel machine to get funding from the past. Due to the red and blues fixing the timeline in Singularity The events of the Shisno Paradox didn't happen so Jax is presumably still doing the film.

 Spencer Porkensenson 
Spencer Porkensenson (Jason Marnocha) Is a process server who first appears in season 15 episode 2 The Cronicle following Dylan and Jax  to find Lavernius Tucker. He later fought in a firefight with the Blue and Reds mistakenly believing that Bucky was Tucker. In the episode Nightmare On Planet Evil he finally finds Tucker who tells him that he was sent by Chorus to serve him Tucker believes that he is his bodyguard manservant until he tells him that You've Been Served child support papers by the new mothers of Chorus much to his horror. Completing his mission he bids the Reds and blues farewell as he will not be seeing them again unless it is in service of the court and tells them his name and that he lives to serve and flies away.

 Cyclops 
Cyclops, or C.C.(Katie Newville), is a large Cyclops Mark II-class military assault droid that was located inside the UNSC Hand Of Merope. It was later found by Sarge who wanted to take it back to base and destroy Freckles as he deemed it a threat however it was too big to bring back in one piece so the Reds dismantle it, and took it back to base to be reassembled. While bringing the parts back to base Grif loses various pieces of the robot forcing Sarge to use the parts he has to reconstruct the robot resulting in it being Mantis-sized. When Sarge activated Cyclops it spoke its name with a female voice making them call it a girl. Before Sarge was about to order her to attack Freckles she threatened the Reds as she had a hardware malfunction believing that there are 16 hostile in the canyon and was about to attack the Reds but shuts down due to Sarge converting her fuel tank to diesel resulting in her running out of power. Cyclops was later repaired by Lopez and Lopez 2.0 but was taken over by Dos.0 who used her to attack Sarge and the Reds and Blues but was later destroyed by Donut who teleported Cyclops and Dos.0 to a mine field killing them.

 Epsilon Doubles 
The Epsilon Doubles are the main characters of season 9. When Epsilon-Church entered the Epsilon unit to look for Tex after the events of season 8, he recreated Blood Gulch by using the Alpha's memories while creating copies of the Reds and Blues. The doubles are similar to the real Reds and Blues, despite acting different at first.

Sarge (ε) differs from his real-world counterpart in that he doesn't hate Grif, is not willing to yell at the other Reds, and allows Donut to give orders. However, after having a private conversation with Donut that lasts a couple of hours, Sarge reverts to his original personality.

Simmons (ε) is nearly identical to his real life counterpart. He expresses that he "hates when things change" as his teammates obtain their original personalities. When he is about to be killed by Andy (ε), he reveals that he respects none of his teammates.

Donut (ε), described by Epsilon as being a "repressed, over-achieving jarhead," orders Sarge and Simmons around when he first appears. He acts violent, wanting to shoot Epsilon on sight rather allowing him to speak. Donut (ε), like his real-world counterpart, keeps a diary. He makes sexual innuendos for much of the time he spends onscreen. After talking with Sarge, he reverts to his original personality.

Grif (ε) is unlike his real-world counterpart in that he appears to be a hard worker. When asked by Simmons to take a break, he claims to be unfamiliar with the concept. he was an extreme neat-freak, shouting at Donut for tracking mud on Red Base's recently waxed floor. It has been hinted that Grif has OCD, which is indicated after he says that doing things 3 times is fun and was hinted to be a germaphobe. when Grif had a break Donut again tracked mud into the base but instead of shouting at him again he told him that he didn't care saying that he's on break returning to his original personality.

Lopez (ε) personality was originally very robotic and monotone, as he has only been seen going through his activation speech and alerting everyone of an earthquake however he also hates the Reds due to there stupidly and not understanding him.

Tucker (ε) personality is the same as his real world counterpart being very foul mouthed, annoying, and perverted in the eyes of other characters however he has a better relationship with Caboose.

Caboose (ε) personality is the same as his real world counterpart being loving and wanting Church's friendship however he has a better relationship with Tucker.

Other characters
Red Team
Warthog
The M12 Light Reconnaissance Vehicle,  codename Warthog (the vehicle's actual name in the Halo video game series) is a battle jeep frequently used by the Red Team. Believing that Grif is suggesting the name of a mythical creature, Sarge mockingly suggests several other mythical creatures — such as Bigfoot, unicorn, leprechaun, and "Chupathingy" (after the Chupacabra) — as names. Chupathingy is the name listed on the character biography, available as an Easter egg for the  DVD. In , Grif notes that the warthog seems to be "really bad luck." During the first two seasons, it spends most of its time out of commission, or being repaired by Lopez. The warthog is frequently blaring loud Mexican ranchera music, most likely set by Lopez, and it can often be heard approaching because of it. Throughout the show, multiple Warthogs are used, destroyed and repaired. They almost always play the same ranchera music.

The original warthog had a homing beacon and remote control system linked to Lopez. This system is accidentally activated in  when Church, then possessing Lopez, and Tucker attempt to activate Lopez's repair sequence. It was during this period that the warthog spoke, voiced by Burnie Burns. Burns suggests that, like Sheila, the vehicle was originally going to be a full-blown character and maintain a personality throughout the series, in a parody of Speed Buggy. However, this idea was abandoned shortly after the remote control gag.

Lopez 2.0
In Season 11, Sarge decides to build a robot to fix the communications dish for the Reds and Blues. Upon completion, the robot coincidentally looks and speaks Spanish like Lopez, much to the chagrin of Grif and Simmons. The robot was named  Lopez 2.0 but more commonly referred to as Dos.0 (Shannon McCormick), which due to misunderstandings leads the Reds to think that the robot is stupid, even though Dos.0 was able to fix the radio transmitter. Dos.0 is initially very loyal and respectful until he meets Lopez, who tells the newer machine all of the bad things about the teams and how conversing with the Red Team will lead the members to make up entire conversations, regardless of the content, allowing for the Lopezes to insult them endlessly. Later, Sarge assigns Dos.0 and Lopez to repair the Cyclops robot (voiced by Katie Newville) that the Reds found on the crashed ship knowing that if they activate the robot it will kill everyone calling Sarge insane. Lopez suggests that they upload Lopez into the robot so that the two can gain respect from the others. However, Dos.0 betrays Lopez and the Reds by uploading himself into the Cyclops to attack the simulation soldiers and kill them. Dos.0 later battled Freckles while telling him that could have ruled the Reds and Blues as their Robot Overlords instead of being a pet to Caboose. Freckles was nearly destroyed by Dos.0 but got distracted and tricked by Donut allowing him to uses a transporter grenade to teleport the Cyclops over a minefield killing him. Lopez in turn takes Dos.0's body and mocks him, even calling him "a jerk" once the destroyed Cyclops body is found in the crash site the following season.

FH57
FH57 were a group of Red simulation troopers who appeared in Season 14. They were at war with AH13 blue team until they were killed by an Alien space craft that crashed into their base. Using the ship they search for more blue soldiers for months until finding life signs from Blood Gulch where they found the Reds and Blues and tried to make a plan to attack the Blue base by using their tank to kill the soldiers until they were found by Caboose who told them that it already happened when he accidentally team killed the leader. Returning back to the ship after telling Caboose not to tell his teammates that they were here they returned to their ship which accidentally activated the self-destruction killing them.

Colonel Turf (Bruce Greene) was the reckless leader of FH57 who was determined to use the alien ship to hunt down and eradicate all the Blues in the galaxy.

Private Sue (Lawrence Sonntag) was a red simulation trooper that was part of squad FH57. He was shown to be rather blunt especially when confronted by Caboose in Blood Gulch and never seems to be too concerned with the situations he is presented with.

Lieutenant Drag (James Willems) was the "cynical asshat" of the red squad known as FH57.

Captain Morgan (Adam Kovic) was a member of the FH57 red team. Morgan is one of the smarter members of the group as he preferred to think things over and plan things out as opposed to rushing in. His name and rank is a reference to a brand of Rum.

Major Santos (Joel Rubin) was a member of the FH57 red team. Santos's is shown to be handy with mechanics and for some reason had an obsession with wine bars. Because of this, he took advantage of Peake's alien cult to stage a mutiny however after hearing a motivation speech from Turf he and Peake stopped the mutiny and was happy when Turf said that there can be room on the ship for a wine shelf.

Private Peake (Matt Peake) was the quiet member of the red squad known as FH57. Inside the alien ship Peake discovered several aliens living in the cargo hold, and after giving them food he became their grand leader. He alongside Santos attempted a mutiny as they were both fed up by their leader Turf's current actions however after hearing a motivation speech from Turf he and Santos stopped the mutiny.

Cherry (Elyse Willems) was an alien ship AI that was repaired by Santos who assisted FH57 on their travels to find blue soldiers. However she had technical problems that caused her to misunderstand verbal commands causing her to initiate the self destruction after mishearing Turf saying shelf-construction killing her and the rest of FH57.

Sarge's Elite Team
Private John
Private John (Rick Robertson) was a man based on John Wayne the actor who was recruited by Sarge and Simmons in the Shisno Paradox to kill Mark Temple of the Blues and Reds by travelling though time alongside George and Alex. After accidentally killing an actor playing Temple he joins Jax to help create his Red vs Blue movie based on the events of Season 15 he later got an audition to play Temple in the movie and was later playing Sarge.

Private George
Private George (Todd Womack) is a historical figure based on the first President of the United States George Washington who was recruited by Sarge and Simmons in the Shisno Paradox to kill Mark Temple of the Blues and Reds alongside John and Alex. After accidentally killing the actor playing Temple in the Red vs Blue movie being made by Jax he became his assistant director.

Private Alex
Private Alex (Chris Kokkinos) was a historical figure based on the king of Macedonia Alexander the Great he was recruited by Sarge and Simmons in the Shisno Paradox to kill Mark temple of the Blues and Reds however Sarge didn't know that he encountered Caboose who accidentally sneezed on him giving him the Common Cold. Because of this, he constantly collapses due to the sickness and ultimately dies due to his immune system not being strong enough to battle the time period's modern diseases.

Blue Team
JuniorBlarggity Blarg-Tucker (Jason Saldaña) commonly known as Junior is the result of the Alien supposedly impregnating Tucker, with a parasitic embryo. In , his voice is first heard. In Season 5, he causes havoc in the Blue Base and Doc feeds him with some of Caboose's blood off-screen. Junior first appears in Episode 80, and is a mini-version of the Alien, with cyan and blue armor. Its existence frustrates Church who threatens to kill it multiple times. In Episode 84, the creature is introduced to Tucker, its "father". Tucker slowly becomes accustomed to this role, even snapping back at Church when he refers to it in a flippant manner. In Episode 91, Tucker is heard to call him Junior, and in Episode 94, Junior mimics Tucker's catch phrase by saying "blarg chicka honk honk". Later on, Junior is sent through the caves with Doc and Sister, where he is found by Captain Butch Flowers, who at the time was possessed by O'Malley. According to Episode 97, Junior is part of "The great prophecy" and is to be the savior of the Alien. The villains, however, intend to use him to control the Aliens. It is later implied that the whole prophecy was largely fictitious.

Junior was taken onto the ship that Tex used to blast off from Blood Gulch, which exploded. However, the ship was later found crashed in Valhalla with no sign of either Junior or anyone else on board. The footage found on the Pelican implies that the Other Alien escaped with Junior before the Pelican crashed. In Recreation, however, Tucker mentions that Junior is with him and together they act as ambassadors between the humans and Aliens. Despite this, Junior does not make an appearance.

Junior would make an appearance in a photograph carried by Tucker in Season 13 where Junior is posing with his 5th grade Basketball team and also appears in Season 13, Episode 19 in the Sangheili Embassy watching Epsilon's message. In Season 15, Tucker reveals Junior entered college with a basketball scholarship.

Rooster Teeth released a video detailing how Junior was filmed at such a small size, later included on the Season 5 DVD, revealing they used forced perspective, placing Junior, whose model is far bigger than the human ones, farther from the camera while hiding the characters' feet.

Jimmy
Private Jimmy (Cole Gallian real self) (John Ferrell False Memory) was a Blue Team Simulation Trooper who was chosen to be the original host body of the Alpha. Not much was known of his past except that he had a girlfriend back home and that he was brought to Sidewinder by Captain Flowers who tells him that he is the 'final piece of a very complex puzzle,' and that the future would see him as the unsung hero of their story. To his horror he was restrained and violently implanted with the Alpha. Jimmy was later killed in the first season of Red vs Blue by Caboose.

When Church was using Jimmy's body, some of his memories merged with the Alphas creating a false backstory which made Church believe that Jimmy who had a southern accent was an old squad mate and that he was killed by Tex by beating him to death with their own skull.

Project Freelancer

The DirectorDirector Leonard  Church  (John Marshall Reed) is the head of Project Freelancer, and is responsible for most of the scenarios that the Red and Blue armies encounter. He and the Chairman of the Oversight Subcommittee are heard in the introductions of the Reconstruction chapters, alternating in a series of messages. He apparently uses both armies as test subjects for his experiments. His own forces wear white armor and run the Command Center that the armies call for missions. Throughout Reconstruction, he was suspected by the Chairman of wrongdoing with his experiments and underwent a criminal investigation for his misuse of military property and the Alpha AI, leading to a warrant for his arrest. In the epilogue, it was revealed that the Director is the original Leonard Church, and the AI Church was based on his own mind. He is haunted by memories of Allison, a woman he loved who died many years ago, and that he inadvertently implanted his memories of her into another AI, Beta, which became Tex.

The Director is shown in person during the flashbacks in Season 9 and Season 10. However, his face is almost always obscured, and he wears a pair of glasses. The Director is shown to be a very strict and unforgiving commander, who is quick to punish failure and deliberately seeds rivalry among the Freelancers. He also shows no concern for the safety of his soldiers, often caring more about the experimental equipment they are using rather than their lives. This attitude and his actions have caused many of the Freelancers, such as Tex, Washington, Carolina, and C.T., to utterly despise him.

In Season 10, he creates an army of Tex clones, each one an attempt to recreate Allison. When Church and Carolina confront him, he is seen viewing Alison's last video on repeat. Upon confrontation, he surrenders and requests Carolina to leave her pistol before proceeding to shut down the facility, and in the final shot of him as Carolina and Church leave he is seen picking it up, implying that he intends to commit suicide. It is also revealed that he has the same green eyes as Carolina and he states "You were my greatest creation" as she is leaving, confirming that Carolina is his daughter, though that is never explicitly stated in the series.

VicVic (introduced voiced by Randall Glass; voiced by Burnie Burns from Season 2 onwards), short for Virtual Intelligent Computer v20, is an AI responsible for overseeing the operations on Blood Gulch, whose terminal is located in a cave below the canyon. He takes the personality of a sardonic and frequently unhelpful communications officer. Unknown to either team, he serves as a contact for both the Blue and Red Teams. Vic behaves like an annoying, ineffective technical support guy, constantly calling people "dude" and often offering obtuse and unhelpful advice and biting insults. Burnie Burns also notes that Vic was intentionally portrayed as over-the-top annoying from Episode 20. Burns based the voice on an eponymous former roommate, who lived with him for a year after Matt Hullum left for Los Angeles following their graduation. During Seasons 4 and 5, where the Reds and Blues had believed to have time travelled to the future, Vic called himself Vic Jr., which Burnie Burns noted was deliberately left unexplained, as the crew felt that sufficient information had been given already for fans to draw their own conclusions. Based on information discovered later, it is implied that Vic and Vic Jr. are the same, and Vic simply pretended he was his own descendant to trick the Red and Blue teams into thinking they were in the future.

In Season 14, Vic gives introductory narration to most episodes, and is featured in one himself, where it is revealed that Vic was originally a far more disciplined and efficient AI programmed by Agent Florida to keep watch over the Blood Gulch simulation. After Florida accidentally tripped a cable, however, Vic malfunctioned and degraded to the persona he displayed in the Blood Gulch Chronicles while also affecting the list of replacement recruits that were originally suppose to arrive in Blood Gulch replacing agents California, Hawaii and Kansas to Caboose, Donut and Kaikaina Grif.

In Season 15, Vic has started to fail from operating so long, becoming suicidal. Dylan takes Vic as a helper A.I. in exchange for killing Vic when he gives her "three wishes". After Loco's time machine is activated, it begins to grow unstable. Dylan has Vic try to shut it off for her third wish, though Vic deletes himself to stabilize the machine. Vic leaves behind a recording parodying Epsilon's speech at the end of Season 13, culminating in him threatening that, if anyone made a backup of him, he will "punch them in the nuts".

Four Seven Niner
Four Seven Niner real name Ash (Lee Eddy) is a pilot working with Project Freelancer. She first appears in the trailer for Season 9, flying a Pelican, trying to get the injured Maine to treatment. The medical station "Angel On My Shoulder", repeatedly denies her clearance to dock and tells her to throttle down, but she is persistent and is eventually allowed to proceed at the request of the Director. 
Throughout Seasons 9 and 10, Four Seven Niner escorts the Freelancers on numerous missions and performs multiple extractions. She also appears in an episode of Season 14 and 15 apiece flying Freelancers to missions.

Four Seven Niner is shown to be sarcastic and free-thinking. When Carolina remarks that she is late for extraction, she responds by saying Carolina could take it out of her tip. In their proceeding escape on the Pelican, she responds to Agent South's complaints by sealing the pilot door in her face. She also despises AI, thinking that they use their abilities to steal jobs from humans. However, she is quick to accept Delta after he admits that he does not know how to fly a Pelican.

In the mini-series "Recovery One" and season 6 Reconstruction, Four Seven Niner is the voice on the other end of Washington's and South's radios, relaying their orders.

Freelancer Agents
The soldiers, mostly called Freelancers, are highly trained elite special ops soldiers for Project Freelancer, and are sent on the most dangerous missions. Their call-signs are based on the fifty states of America.

Tex
Freelancer Agent Texas, also known as Tex or Beta, real name Allison, is voiced by Burnie Burns in her initial appearance and her Season 15 cameo, and Kathleen Zuelch thereafter. Out of the eight main characters, Tex was the last to appear, not debuting until . Although she is associated with the Blue Team, she is not an official member, but rather a mercenary "paid" to help them. Her backstory with Project Freelancer and previous affiliation with fellow Blue Team member Church are key elements in the plot. With her Special Operations training, she is the most lethal member of the Blood Gulch cast, and especially so while she is still implanted with the Omega AI.

Despite her skill, she has a tendency to fall short in her objectives, which Epsilon reveals to be part of the process that created her: when the Director made the Alpha out of his mind, the "Beta" AI emerged from the memories of his deceased wife Allison, an accomplished soldier who died in battle. Because all the Director can remember of Allison was her failing to return alive, Tex is always doomed to fail just as victory is in her grasp. In Season 1 alone, Tex is easily captured by Sarge after beating up three Reds and retrieving the Blue flag, and ends up killed by Donut while attacking Red Base with a tank.

At first, Tex was intent on destroying her AI, Omega\O'Malley, knowing it had evil intentions. However, by the end of Season 5, O'Malley convinces Tex to join him as both could use Junior to end the war that led to the creation of Project Freelancer. Tex escapes in a ship at the end of Blood Gulch Chronicles, with Andy, Sheila, Gamma, and Omega. After Andy detonates, this ship crashes in Reconstruction and The Meta steals her as well as Gamma and Omega. Tex is later deleted in the EMP blast set by Washington. She briefly reappeared in the trailer of Recreation along with Church, as a narrator, but does not appear in the series proper.

In Revelation, Epsilon-Church comes across a new robot body made for Tex in an abandoned facility and uses his memories to recreate Tex, a version referred to as "Epsilon-Tex" and with much adeptness in hand-to-hand combat, as her debut has her mercilessly and repeatedly pummeling Sarge, Simmons, Grif and Tucker. Later Epsilon-Tex sets up a trap for Wash and the Meta, and the latter ends capturing her and using Beta to power his armor. After the Meta dies, Epsilon enters the capture unit to find Tex. Once she is found in a recreation of Blood Gulch, Epsilon-Church in the capture unit, Epsilon finally lets her go by saying "I forget you", not wishing to let her live a life of never-ending failures.

In Season 9 in the past storyline, she joins Project Freelancer as a Master Captain, but shortly rises through the Freelancer ranks and takes the top spot over Carolina, which created a rivalry. Carolina was especially affected by the fact that she could never seem to beat Tex, who in turn did not show much animosity towards Carolina.

In Season 10, Church and Carolina return to the facility looking to kill the Director, when it was revealed that the Director had kept trying to recreate Tex and instead had created dozens of angered Tex copies, which only shut down as Epsilon talks to the Tex AI powering the drones and asks her to rest. Afterwards, the Director is revealed to be Carolina's father, showing that Tex's begrudging respect for Carolina comes from how she was based on the agent's mother.

In Season 13, a vision of Tex is seen as part of Carolina's worst fears. Epsilon-Tex's helmet is also seen in Hargrove's trophy room.

In Season 15  it is revealed that during one test involving simulation troopers, Tex led the Reds to take the Blue flag, eventually battling Carolina who was leading the Blues, killing Biff and accidentally beginning Temple's quest for vengeance.

WyomingWyoming, true name Reginald (Matt Hullum), is a ruthless mercenary with an English accent—his character profile on the DVDs states his place of birth as "somewhere British" — introduced in the series when O'Malley hires him to kill Tucker. Wyoming has a habit of giving an insincere "sorry" to his victims just prior to killing them, but, in one instance, retracts this apology when Tex complains to him that he destroyed her alien ship. He also is never shown getting agitated, showing no signs of annoyance when he cannot spot his target during an assassination. Wyoming is fond of knock-knock jokes, a trait he passed on to his AI Gamma.

Wyoming has an armor enhancement, the time distortion unit, which he uses to continually loop a particular stretch of time in order to modify events in his favor. His use of the time looping is discovered by Tucker, who eventually lulls Wyoming into complacency and stabs him with a sword early in the loop, killing him. However, he and Church quickly discovered that, several copies of Wyoming were created as a result of the loop. In the resulting chaos the Reds attacked the Wyomings, leaving only one alive. The final Wyoming is then dispatched by Tex. Tex then uses Wyoming's helmet to obtain coordinates for the ship in which she later escapes, but ends up being blown. In Reconstruction, it is implied that once the bomb exploded, the time distortion was activated, with the ensuing time dilation leading the ship to take nearly a year to crash land in Outpost-17B (Valhalla). Wyoming's armor enhancement was then taken by The Meta.

In the Season 9 flashbacks he is shown fighting Tex along with Maine and York in a training session where the three are beaten repeatedly by Tex. In the last round of eight, all of which Tex won, he and Maine use live ammo, Wyoming even manages to hit her during the fight, but they are still beaten. He is depicted without his helmet in Chapter 6 of Season 10, revealing he has black hair and a handlebar mustache. Wyoming is depicted as a sniper and has a careful style of attack. He is implied to be the first one attacked by a crazed Maine, however he manages to evade death and the removal of his AI.

The auditions for Wyoming are described by the cast as "terrible", almost every cast member auditioned for the role doing various accents-for example, Joel Heyman performed a Cockney accent, Burnie Burns an Australian accent-and eventually Matt Hullum's British accent, considered the only acceptable one.

York
Agent New York, referred to as York (Sean Duggan), is another member of the AI experimental program. York is an infiltration specialist who seems to have become unemployed since the program closed down. His left eye was severely injured in a grenade explosion during a 3 on 1 fight against Tex, with Wyoming and Maine. Despite his armor's healing unit, his eye did not heal, nor did it later save his life.

He is found by Tex during Part 3 of the miniseries Out of Mind, trying to break into a store. It is revealed that he still had Delta. Here he accepts Tex's proposal of infiltrating Omega's base. At the end of Out of Mind, he and Tex attempt a raid on Omega's base. The two are caught in a firefight against Wyoming and two of his minions. As the two scramble for cover, York is shot twice in the chest by Wyoming, and Delta reports that the bullets were fatal. The AI stays with York and manages to trick Wyoming with a hologram of Tex. Delta chooses to stay with York until his death, rather than go with Tex, appearing to perish with him as the armor shuts down. The healing unit in his armor would later be retrieved, along with Delta, by Washington.

He appears in the trailer for Season 9, where he removes his helmet, revealing the broken eye, and brown/red hair. This marks him as the third character aside from Vic/Vic Jr, North, South. to have his face fully revealed. In Season 9, the origin of his eye wound is revealed. During the paintball fight with Tex, a live grenade meant for Tex is detonated next to him. He is also shown to have some kind of relationship with Carolina, who inquires about his eye when he returns from the hospital. York is shown to have a sarcastic personality. For example, while attempting to organize his team against Tex in the training mission, he makes several sarcastic remarks when his suggestions are ignored. He is also the first Freelancer to officially receive an AI.

It was revealed that he met Carolina at a club, where she takes his lighter from him. During the raid on the Mother Of Invention where Texas attempted to retrieve the Alpha AI York sided with her, telling Carolina that he was 'doing the right thing', after having been told by his AI Delta of Alpha's torture. When facing Carolina York seemed hesitant to fight her and was quickly defeated by her while battling hand-to-hand in a zero gravity environment. Before leaving Carolina threw her cigarette lighter to York, something which brought York great sadness since he understood that she didn't expect to see him again. Whether this was because Carolina now considered York to be a traitor or because she didn't expect to survive her battle with Texas has been left unclear.

SouthAgent South Dakota, referred to as South (Shana Merlin), is another member of Project Freelancer. South signed up with her twin brother, who was appropriately given the codename North Dakota. Unlike some of the other operatives, however, South was not given an AI partner; according to South, there was more than one group of soldiers for implantation, and after complications with the first group, specifically Washington himself, no other AIs were given to operatives in the next group, including South. Later, Delta states she was part of an experiment alongside her brother, North, to analyze how some agents without AIs would respond to working with agents who did have them. She still, however, received an armor enhancement, able to create a domed energy shield.

South's first appearance is in Part 2 of the mini-series Recovery One, where she is found by Washington alongside her deceased brother. South claims that she found North already dead when she arrived, and North's AI, Theta, was already missing. Washington is ordered by command to kill South, but instead keeps her with him, as he believes the Freelancers are being hunted and he could use help. As he dislikes having an AI implanted into himself, he resolves to giving South the Delta AI he had already recovered. When they encounter The Meta, she shoots him in the back so she can make an easier getaway from their enemy. She then radios command, and it is revealed she also operates under the codename Recovery Two, and that she was using Washington to draw out the enemy so that command could devise a strategy against it with the promise of an AI as a reward. She then refuses to return to base, flying away with Delta. Command threatens to locate her with other agents, but South claims she is more worried about something else.

In the opening episode of Reconstruction, South's whereabouts are listed on a communications screen as still unknown. A very much-alive Washington states his desire to hunt her down, and his superior states that they are not far from letting him, also feeling the sting of her betrayal, although Washington harbors some resentment towards Command as well, given that South was under their orders when she attacked him. In Chapter 4 South is shown to be following Washington, but unbeknownst to her, The Meta is as well. In the next Chapter, Washington receives a call from his commanders alerting him to the fact that South is in critical danger, as shown by a distress beacon sent by Delta. When Washington and the others arrive, they find South under heavy fire from The Meta, using her energy shield enhancement to protect herself. She then attempts to abandon Delta and her enhancement so she can escape. Caboose guns her down to stop her from escaping. After The Meta leaves, Washington interrogates her, according to Delta, South also betrayed her brother North much like how she had betrayed Washington. Delta says that her injuries will only hinder them and there is a high probability she would betray them again, so Washington kills her in mid-sentence, securing vengeance for himself and North in the process.

Season 9 has featured South as an active operative under Project Freelancer, carrying out a mission with her brother North, during which they frequently employ a tag-team style of combat. She is much more impulsive in her actions, though, ignoring half of his advice, charging into most situations without thinking too far ahead, and much more eager to get her hands dirty. However, this same impulsive attitude often causes her to make bad decisions, forcing the Director to ban her from future missions. In Season 10, South is allowed to participate in missions again, though she is clearly bitter over the fact that she will not receive an AI like North did. During the revolt on the 'Mother of Invention', she blocked Tex's way and nearly killed her out of spite, but is stopped by her brother, who fights her. Once she removes her helmet while complaining to the Director, South is revealed to be a blonde headed woman with a large scar on her left cheek.

NorthAgent North Dakota, referred to as North (John Erler), is South's twin brother, even dressing in similar armor.  His only appearance before the Season 9 flashbacks is of his dead body, which Washington found after receiving a distress signal sent out by North's armor. Like York, North still had his AI partner, Theta, in his possession at the time of his death, but Washington and South surmise that it was stolen by his attacker. While surveying his dead body, South gives a lengthy spiel about growing up with North and how the two of them were both so alike in almost every way. It is revealed in Reconstruction that South actually betrayed him in order to lure The Meta into stealing North's armor components, giving South the time she needed to flee. Delta claims she lured him into a position where he could be killed as opposed to killing him directly.

Season 9 has featured North as an active operative under Project Freelancer, carrying out a mission with his sister South, during which they frequently employ a tag-team style of combat, perfectly in sync with each other. He's much more methodical in his actions than his sister, attempting to rein her in by being her voice of reason, but he also appears to have no problem adapting to sudden changes in the plan. In Season 10, it is revealed that he was given Theta due to North's caring attitude and Theta's shyness. Wash once described North as being the team's designated sharpshooter.

North has provided an example of what happens when the enhanced armor abilities are utilized without the assistance of an AI unit, by applying a domed energy shield on top of a Pelican mid-flight to block oncoming missiles, which prevents the crash but leads him to collapse once his armor overheated. During the process, he removes his helmet, revealing himself as a blonde man, who in the incident gets a scar in his cheek that mirrors the one South already had. Later he ended up fighting his sister aboard the 'Mother of Invention'.

C.T.Agent Connecticut, also known as Connie or C.T. (Samantha Ireland) was a member of Project Freelancer, a Caucasian woman with brown hair and brown eyes shown to be much more unnerved and anxious about the rankings and missions, along with a wariness as to why they are pushed so far, and especially how the agents are pitted against each other. C.T. eventually defects to the Insurrectionists, romancing their leader and giving classified Freelancer information to him. As the Insurrectionists attack the Freelancer flagship, C.T. escapes with them to a hideout in a shipyard. Once the Freelancers attack, C.T. insists she and the Leader should escape, but he refuses to eave without his teammates. Tex and Carolina break into the bunker and C.T. tries to explain to them why she left Project Freelancer but the two do not believe her and a battle ensures. Tex ends up mortally wounding C.T. but the Leader manages to drag her into an escape pod, and they escape. As C.T. dies in his arms, she hands the Leader a device containing a location to where an artifact is. After she dies, the Leader then takes her armor and the C.T. codename.

When Tex inspects a dog tag on C.T.'s locker, she finds a data chip that once uploaded, reveals a recording of C.T. informing her that after digging through Project Freelancer's files, she knows of what the Director has done to the Alpha and that Tex herself is the shadow of Allison; the Director's long-lost love. C.T. states she left this copy of the data she took specifically for Tex; not because she is the best fighter, but because she is the most trustworthy.

Maine/The MetaAgent Maine is first introduced as The Meta (Matt Hullum), the primary antagonist of the Recollection trilogy. The Meta has an inability to speak, only communicating through in growls, due to an injury he sustained in earlier missions.

He first appears in Reconstruction as a mysterious character, who is hunting down Freelancers, killing them, and taking their equipment and AIs. He referred to as "The Meta" by Agent Washington and the Counselor, in reference to a cryptic message scratched into a wall of Outpost 17-B's Red base. He proves to be a capable foe for The Reds, Blues and Washington. Prior to the events of Reconstruction he managed to obtain seven AIs, and eventually obtains an eighth before losing them all when Washington sets off an EMP at Freelancer command.

In Revelation, The Meta is shown to be working with Washington. He is also shown to have difficulties using his armor enhancements due to the loss of his AIs. The Meta later captures the revived Tex and betrays Washington, using the captured AI to power his cloaking field. Later, when the Reds and Blues attack, The Meta manages to fight them off, but Sarge tricks him and attaches a Warthog's tow-hook to his chest. Grif and Simmons push the Warthog over a nearby cliff. Sarge manages to dislodge the capture unit from The Meta's back just before he is pulled over the edge, where he falls to his death. This is confirmed by Chairman Hardgrove in Season 13 as he uses Maine's armor to give Locus and Felix incentive to work harder. Afterwards, Grif keeps his Brute Shot as a trophy.

In the Season 9 and 10 flashbacks, Maine is shown to be less skilled in combat than other Freelancers such as Tex and Carolina, relying primarily on brute strength than precise skill. However, he more than makes up for this through his incredible endurance. He is consistently shown to continue fighting despite suffering injuries that would cripple, if not outright kill, anyone else. During one mission in Season 9, Maine took a sniper bullet to the chest, got hit by a Warthog and had an entire magazine of bullets emptied into his neck, the injury that made him lose his deep and rough voice, and instead only growl. To help him communicate again, Carolina gave Maine her AI, Sigma. This leads her to later blame herself for the creation of the Meta, as Sigma corrupted Maine into going after other fragments. Season 10 reveals Maine's head, but not his face, showing that he is bald and has the Meta symbol tattooed in the back of his head.

UtahAgent Utah (Kerry Shawcross) is briefly mentioned by Washington in the aftermath of North's hasty decision to use enhanced armor abilities in the field, which are presumably still in early experimental stages. Utah is provided as an example of how dangerous it is to use said equipment without the assistance of an AI unit, as during training it is implied such an action did not end well for Utah, possibly leading to death or severe injury.

In a deleted scene, Utah is shown to have been testing his bubble shield in training. Despite activating the armor enhancement in Project Freelancer facilities under a supervised environment, the shield only materialized around his head, quickly forcing him to pass out. This implies his death.

In an Easter egg after the credits on the season 10 DVD. It shows that Utah survived his test with the shield. Utah finds Georgia's lucky penny.

GeorgiaAgent Georgia (Kerry Shawcross) was briefly mentioned by Agent Carolina before the team jumped out of the Pelican during the attack on the U.N.S.C. Scrap Metal Recycling Station. Carolina said that the team should use their jet packs sparingly or end up like Georgia. When Wash asked what happened to Georgia, South tells him that no one knows. In when the Freelancers use their jet packs to reach the station, York is surprised at this course of action given what happened to Georgia. When Wash again asks what happened to Georgia, York simply says, "Dude, you do not wanna know." In Chapter 4, Washington tries to escape a nuclear bomb, but refuses to use his jet pack as he does not want to end up like Georgia. After the credits on the Season 10 DVD it shows what happens to Georgia. He slams in to a space station wall after forgetting his lucky penny.

FloridaCaptain Butch Flowers (Ed Robertson) was the Blue Team's previous commanding officer at Blood Gulch. His character is introduced when Church arrives at Blood Gulch after "travelling back in time". Flowers had been planning to lead a Blue offensive to destroy the Red Team in Blood Gulch, claiming he knew the key to the Blues' victory. However, before he can lead the attack he dies in his sleep. Church attempts to save Flowers, but he has a fatal allergic reaction to the aspirin medication, and dies anyways. After Flowers' death, Tucker, who had been wearing regulation blue armor, claims his captain's armor for himself. In , it is revealed that one of the Blues is to be promoted to captain, and Grif's sister is sent to fill the discrepancy.

Captain Flowers returns in Episode 96, wearing Tucker's old blue armor, accompanied by a new alien. He is revealed to be O'Malley's current host, and expresses a strong interest in Junior. Andy reveals in Episode 97 that the Alien revived Flowers. In Episode 99, he talks to Vic Jr. where they discuss their plans concerning Junior. Once O'Malley leaves his body he rejoins the Blue team in the final episode, but is shot in the head by a sniper rifle before he has a chance to reveal the information key to the Blues' victory. In season 16, it is revealed that Butch was killed by a future version of Tucker who accidentally killed him believing that the sniper rifle safety was off.

Flowers appears unnamed throughout the flashbacks in Season 9 and Season 10, assisting the Freelancers. When they infiltrate the base to pursue the Leader and C.T., the Leader realizes he is being followed and throws a tomahawk, scoring a direct hit on Flowers and knocking him to the ground. However, he quickly recovers, pulls the tomahawk from his shoulder and throws it at the Insurrectionist Turret Soldiers pinning down the Freelancers. However, the tomahawk falls short of its target. He then shoots a nearby crane arm, which knocks the Insurrectionists into a pit, where they are crushed by a falling crate.

In the finale of Season 10 it is revealed that he was a former agent of Project Freelancer, Agent Florida. He was tasked with protecting the Alpha in Blood Gulch, the Counselor then stated to the Director he would then cover up Florida's disappearance. It is implied that this is accomplished by destroying the state of Florida.

IllinoisAgent Illinois was a demolitions expert and drinking buddy of York. Unlike many other Freelancer agents, Illinois was neither ambitious or competitive; instead he focused on his dream to own a home on a tropical island (with a tiny red sailboat), which he achieved after the fall of Project Freelancer. Temple later finds him, and kills Illinois with the armor lock mode. His armor, along with that of nine other agents, is seen in his secret room.

The Triplets
Season 14 has two episodes focusing on the worst agents of Project Freelancer, who for their close friendship are nicknamed "The Triplets". They are Ohio (Elizabeth Maxwell), real name Vera, frustrated with the incompetence of her friends and not being assigned missions by Command; Idaho (Barrett Tribe), real name Ezra, a level-headed but incompetent soldier; and Iowa (Shannon McCormick), real name Mike, who after an accident that left him for minutes without oxygen became dim-witted and erratic, along with a destructive driver. For their bad performances but proficiency in working together, Command eventually gives them a mission in an ice planet, that turns out to be just an excuse to exhile the Triplets. In the planet, they find a base with equally stranded troops from Charon Industries, Sherry (Kat Ramzinski), Darryl (Aaron Alexander) and Terrill (Bill Wise) - a parody off of Newhart - and Ohio eventually decides to start a grudge which would essentially become a stalemate reminiscent of how Red vs. Blue started ("the only reason we need to be here is because they have a base over there, and the only reason they need a base is because we're here").

Shannon McCormick, who also wrote the episodes, revealed that along with voicing the character named after his home state, he named  his companions for the states Iowa is normally confused with.

Freelancer Artificial Intelligences
Created by Project Freelancer, the AI's are programs that are partnered with the Freelancers for improved performance (similar to Cortana in the original Halo). The original AI, Alpha (Church), was tortured in order to split its personality, creating new AIs. Each of these fragments possessed a different aspect of the Alpha's personality. However, some of these AIs malfunctioned, resulting in events like Epsilon's attempted suicide and Omega's rampage. This brought the end of the implantation process. In Reconstruction, The Meta seeks to possess the AIs and armor upgrades of all other Freelancers, and he eventually collected seven. These AIs were destroyed by an EMP at the end of Reconstruction. The fragmented Alpha AIs currently survive as memories inside the Epsilon unit, as revealed in Revelation.

Omega
A common enemy of both the Red and Blue Teams, O'Malley (voiced by Burnie Burns, Matt Hullum, or whoever the AI is possessing) is an AI program and the primary antagonist of The Blood Gulch Chronicles. O'Malley's real name is Omega. The name O'Malley originates from a portmanteau of Omega and Tex's real name, Allison (Om'Alli). Tex claims Omega was a program designed to enhance her combat skills, but it also brought a violent attitude. According to Agent Washington, he inherited the ability to jump via radio to other hosts from the Alpha. Washington notes that while they tried to reassign him, he had a preference for Tex, and would always find his way back to her.

O'Malley is sadistically evil and aggressive and was created as a parody of over-the-top, megalomaniacal supervillains. O'Malley, being the Alphas fragment of rage, wants to annihilate both teams, and take over the universe. He expresses these desires in long monologues accompanied by extended fits of evil laughter.

Toward the end of Season 1, just before Tex attacks the Reds, O'Malley assesses that Tex has little chance of survival and jumps via radio into Caboose. Under O'Malley's possession, Caboose periodically makes threatening statements, but O'Malley is never able to take full control, possibly due to Caboose not having much of a mind in the first place. After being forced out of Caboose by Church and Tex, O'Malley possesses Doc, of whom he is able to take control of and use to further his own agenda, however, Doc often resurfaces, causing O'Malley to constantly argue with himself. He seems to work for Vic to some degree, hiring Wyoming to assassinate Tucker. In Episode 73 it is revealed that O'Malley, Doc and Lopez had been hiding in a secret lair. Near the end of Season 4, he sees a chance to leave and jumps out of Doc.

Throughout most of  his location is unknown; the Blues assume he is in Sheila because of her erratic and violent behavior. The suspicion then falls on Church when Sheila reveals O'Malley's current location to be "the Blue leader." This is quickly dispelled by Church in Episode 96 as he was never officially promoted, and it is then revealed that O'Malley is currently inhabiting Captain Butch Flowers. In Episode 100, Tex begins broadcasting on an open channel to lure O'Malley. O'Malley then jumps to nearly everyone in the canyon, and is then voiced by each character's respective voice actor. When he finally jumps into Tex, they board the ship and take off. Then Andy the bomb, who was placed on the ship by the Reds, detonates, apparently killing everyone on board.

In Reconstruction it is revealed that the ship crashed and Omega was stolen by a mysterious new enemy, The Meta. He was originally meant to have a larger role in Chapter 19, where a battle scene between The Meta and the Recovery Agents is shown. One idea was Omega possessing a Recovery Agent and using the body to kill other agents. Omega is eventually wiped out with the seven other AI collected by the EMP blast set off by Washington in Reconstruction. However, he, along with the other AI fragments, survives as a memory in Epsilon.

Omega appears in Episode 15 of Season 10. He is shown to be a much more menacing character than in The Blood Gulch Chronicles. He speaks in a low guttural growl in an angry tone. During Tex's sparring match with Carolina, Tex orders Omega to log off and stay out of the fight, to which he snarls "Next time." Omega then reveals the true extent of his malice when Carolina breaks down due to the strain having two AIs in her mind. He goads Tex to kill Carolina, but Tex resists.

Despite Omega's erasure in Season 6, he was able to leave remnants of his personality in former hosts. Caboose, who was infected by Omega in Season 1, was able to enter a state of rage when angered while Doc, after entering an alternate dimension in Season 11, gained a split personality called O'Malley who later became the dominant personality in Season 16.

Omega is one of the few characters to be voiced by more than one actor; several of the production crew, including Burnie Burns, have claimed they prefer the O'Malley presented by Matt Hullum. The O'Malley presented by Hullum has been regarded as a combination of Dr. Evil, Gollum and many other villains.

GammaGamma, also known as Gary by combining its name with that of its original owner, Reginald\Wyoming, is an AI housed in a computer, similar to Durandal in Marathon. He talks through Mac OS X voice synthesizer, System Voice "Fred", and represents the Alpha's Deceit.

Church first encounters Gary after he "travels back in time". He talks of the existence of "The Great Weapon", which is part of "The Great Prophecy". This prophecy later proves to be fictitious. He is fond of jokes, and sometimes uses knock-knock jokes to communicate instead of giving a straight answer. He claims to have been built by Aliens, but knows nothing about his creators, only about the Shisno, a pejorative towards humans.

After learning the name of Wyoming's AI (Gamma), Church concludes that Gary is actually Gamma and not an alien computer. Church phones Gary, and after an awkward conversation of Gary saying he is not Gamma, Gary hangs up, and has a short conversation with Wyoming himself, who instructs Gary to "hop in." It is later apparent that Gary used Wyoming's special ability to loop back in time to contact Church. At the end of Episode 97 Gary occupies the tank which previously housed Sheila's AI. He begins to shoot at the Blues under the command of Wyoming, but Tucker quickly plugs a cable from the ship housing Sheila into the tank. Sheila downloads Gary into the ship and locks him behind a firewall.

In Reconstruction, the ship that crash landed in Outpost 17-B is confirmed to be the same that housed Gary in the finale of the Blood Gulch Chronicles. Afterwards, The Meta took both Gamma and the armor enhancement from Wyoming's helmet. Gamma is eventually wiped out with the seven other AI collected by The Meta during the EMP blast set off by Washington in Reconstruction.

In Chapter 16 of Revelation, the computer that Gary is represented by is seen while Tex and Epsilon-Church are talking. He makes an appearance in Season 10, where he misleads Carolina on the strength of Tex's AI, Omega. Sigma, seeing an opportunity to get two AI in one target, builds on the lie.

Delta
The AI fragment representing Alpha's logic, Delta (or "D" for short, voiced by Mark Bellman) is originally assigned to York. Unlike the other agents, York somehow retained his AI after the program closed. Unlike some of the other AIs, Delta does not pose a threat to anyone. Instead, he is extremely logical and analytical, to the point of being largely unfamiliar with human emotions.  Delta is also polite and well-mannered, even bidding good luck to his enemy Wyoming when he believed himself to be shutting down. York often asks for Delta's advice on certain situations, such as whether or not to help Tex, and uses Delta to watch his left side during combat due to his visual impairment. Burnie Burns also notes that Delta was useful in Recovery One as a way of reminding the audience indirectly of the various rules of the freelancer program and the AIs.

Delta often appears as a holographic miniature soldier beside York's head; the green glow was created in-game by using the plasma pistol according to Burnie Burns.  However, Delta can modify his appearance to match the situation. When threatened by Tex, he went "on alert" and his glow turned red. Later, in a ploy to trick Wyoming, Delta managed to change his size and color, and appears as a hologram of Tex.

After York was fatally wounded at O'Malley's base, Delta decide to stay with him, having picked up a fond attachment to his host. When an operative dies their armor shuts down the AIs within them, and so it was believed Delta perished with York. However, some time later, Agent Washington comes to collect Delta, who is alive and confused as to why he was not shut down. Washington explains that AIs are too expensive to simply destroy, so they are instead encrypted for a Recovery Agent to pick them up, after which they are stored. Washington then removes Delta from York's suit and takes him away. Delta is later implanted in South, as Washington dislikes having an AI due to a past incident. Agent Washington intends for her to assist him in confronting an unknown enemy that has been hunting the remaining freelancers. Following this, South betrays Washington, shooting him and taking Delta. It is then revealed this was part of commands plan. However, she betrays command as well and escapes with Delta, all she wanted was an AI.

In Reconstruction, South is still shown to be in possession of Delta, who warns her about the risks of following Washington. They are attacked by The Meta, and South attempts to abandon Delta as bait, but she is stopped by Caboose. He is then given to Caboose as a new host just before Washington, on Delta's advice, kills South. Not long after, The Meta finds an unconscious Caboose, who split off from the group on Delta's insistence. Several other AIs appear around Delta as The Meta collects him, welcoming him while he remains silent. In Caboose's mind, Church discovers critical information that Delta left in order to help Washington: the message, "Memory is the key." Caboose's mental projection of Delta also warns Church that the next time they meet, the AI may not want his help. In Chapter 16, it is revealed that Delta is the logic fragment of Alpha which the Alpha shed so as to not be able to analyze the pain it endured. In Chapter 19 Delta is destroyed by the EMP set by Washington.

Delta reappears briefly in Revelation, when Epsilon-Church is temporarily disabled. He reveals that he and the other collected AI fragments have been able to secretly maintain their existence within Epsilon's memories. However, he fears Epsilon will eventually discover their existence. Delta then warns Caboose that Epsilon is trying to regain his memories, some of which could drive him to insanity again.

During Season 12, episode 11 Epsilon-Delta is seen during Epsilon-Church's hyper-fast analysis of Carolina's fight with the Space Pirates; Delta questions Church's decisions. Church respond that "sometimes, you just gotta have faith".

In Season 13, episode 11 Carolina orders Church to run all of her armor enhancements at once. When Church begins yet another analysis, Delta freezes and dematerializes. During episode 20, Delta asks if Church is sure about defragmenting himself to power the Meta's armor, which Church confirms, before having Delta record his final goodbye to the Reds and Blues.

ThetaTheta (J.D. Burns)  was Agent North Dakota's artificial intelligence unit during the AI experimental program, the fragment that represents Alpha's Trust. Towards the program's end, Theta was assigned to North while North's twin-sister South was given no AI, to see how the three would react. Later on, when The Meta began to hunt down and kill the Freelancers, taking their equipment and AIs, Theta, North, and South were attacked by the rogue Freelancer. In order to survive, South allowed North to be killed (off-camera) and let The Meta take Theta so that she could escape.

Theta remained with The Meta while he hunted down and took several more AI units. In Reconstruction Chapter 8, Theta is among the AIs that welcome Delta into The Meta's stolen AI collection. Theta is eventually wiped out with the seven other AI collected by The Meta during the EMP blast set off by Washington in Reconstruction.

Theta appears in Season 10. In addition to now having more childlike proportions, he displays very childlike traits such as hiding behind North's leg when first introduced to other Freelancers and playing on a holographic skateboard during a lecture. He demonstrated exceptional skills in managing North's Shield enhancement.

Epsilon-Theta later appears in Season 12, during Epsilon's hyper-fast analysis of Carolina's fight with Space Pirates.

SigmaSigma (Elijah Wood, the Alpha's Creativity and Ambition, was originally Agent Carolina's AI unit, but she gave it to Maine after his vocal cords were shot so he could communicate. In Season 10, he displays great interest in the idea of AI rampancy, specifically the theoretical fourth stage, Metastability, in which an AI can be considered fully human. Sigma believed that if it brought together all of the AI fragments that he would become the Alpha. He even manages to trick Carolina into getting two AIs. It was Sigma that convinced Agent Maine to kill his fellow Freelancers and steal their AI and equipment, becoming The Meta. He never achieves his goal, however as Sigma, along with all the AIs captured by The Meta, was destroyed in an EMP.

Eta and IotaEta and Iota, the Alpha's fear and happiness, were two artificial intelligences implanted in Agent Carolina. Originally intended for Washington or South, Carolina instead requested to receive two, so she could increase her abilities and become a better agent than Tex. Following the Freelancer Break-in led by Tex, the Mother of Invention crashes on Sidewinder, The Meta removes both from Carolina. They are eventually wiped out with the six other AI collected by The Meta during the EMP blast set off by Washington in Reconstruction.

The InsurrectionCharon Private Security Forces also referred to as  The Insurrection or the Resistance by Project Freelancer is a military force that has defected from the UNSC, shown in the prequel sections of Season 9 and Season 10 and is the main antagonist of Project Freelancer However, they are actually UNSC soldiers hired by Charon Industries to act as their private security force. They are first seen in Chapter 2 of Season 9. They take the attitude of nonchalance towards their duties, and are commonly used for comic relief during a stressful scene. They also show little aptitude in combat, and are repeatedly pummeled by the Freelancers. Some Insurrectionist, however, are more competent in combat, these soldiers serve as powerful foes to the Freelancers.

Insurrectionist Demo ManThe Insurrectionist Demo Man (Brandon Farmahini) first appears in Season 9, Chapter 2, appearing to be in charge of the Bjørdinal Cryogenics Research Facility. When North and South Dakota infiltrate the base to steal a data file, the Demo Man, along with dozens of other Insurrectionist soldiers, surround the two Freelancers on a heli-pad. He mans a turret and demands the two return the file, however Carolina appears and knocks him down and the three Freelancers proceed to fight the Insurrectionists. The Demo Man manages to get back on the turret and heavily injure North before Carolina sends him, along with other soldiers, into the water below. Later, when the Freelancers are infiltrating a building, he sends a squad up to kill the Freelancers. In the following chapter, he, along with dozens of Insurrectionists, surround the Freelancers on top of the building. He demands York disarm Tex's bomb, but York reveals it isn't a bomb, only a transmitter. York then hands the Demo Man the transmitter, who looks up just as a MAC round crushes the building.

He reappears in Season 10, Chapter 7, revealing he survived the events of the previous season. In a battle at the Insurrection base, he drives a Warthog, while the Female Soldier uses the turret. Twice during the battle he saves the Female Soldier from being killed by Carolina. When lifts his arm to fire his shotgun, it is revealed that he has a robotic arm after the events of the previous season. He manages to do impressive feats with his new arm, such as catching a grenade from Maine's Brute Shot. Eventually, Maine throws the blade of the Brute Shot to slice his arm off, then knocks him into the water. In a deleted scene from Season 10, after the battle at Longshore, he washes up on a beach. Having now lost both arms, he swears he will have his revenge on Project Freelancer.

Insurrectionist SniperThe Insurrectionist Sniper (Nathan Zellner) first appears in Season 9, Chapter 13. He wears binoculars on his helmet and has a cross-hair emblem on his armor. Later, in Chapter 17, he is part of the response team sent out to stop the Freelancers from stealing a briefcase. He, the Insurrectionist Female Soldier and the Sleeveless Soldier follow the Freelancers Warthog using jet packs and engage them on the highway.

He later appears in Season 10, Chapter 7, using a seagull as target practice. In the following chapter the Freelancers attack the Insurrectionist base. As they begin their attack, the Insurrectionist Sniper appears, alongside other snipers and pins down the Freelancers. Carolina asks North for help and he throws his Domed Energy Shield in the direction of the snipers. The enhancement lands beside the group and activates. The Sniper then tells the soldiers to hold their fire. However, one of the soldiers fires at the shield and the bullet bounces off and kills him. The dead soldier falls, firing the rest of his ammo inside the shield causing the bullets to ricochet, killing the remaining soldiers including the Sniper.

Insurrectionist Female SoldierThe Insurrectionist Female Soldier (Hannah Hart) first appears walking down a highway with other high ranking Insurrectionists. She makes a larger appearance in the Chapter 17, where she is part of an Insurrectionist response team, sent out to stop the Freelancers on the highway. Her, the Insurrectionist Sniper and the Sleeveless Soldier follow the Freelancers Warthog using jet packs and engage them, they are unsuccessful. She prefers to dual wield pistols as her primary weapons.

In Season 10, she asks why the Insurrectionists should trust C.T., who had recently defected. She removes her helmet and is revealed to be a blond, Caucasian woman. During the battle at the Insurrection base, her and the Demo Man fight Carolina and Maine on a platform. Eventually, she is knocked off but manages to grab on to the platform above the water. Maine, holding the Demo Man's disembodied, robotic arm, offers the Female a hand. She mistakes it for her fellow soldier and when she grabs it, Maine lets go and she falls down, hitting her back before falling into the water.

Insurrectionist Sleeveless SoldierThe Insurrectionist Sleeveless Soldier is a soldier that prefers to use brute strength over weapons. He first appears in Season 9, Chapter 13, walking down a highway with other Insurrectionist leaders. In the next chapter, he appears as a member of the response team sent to stop the Freelancers from taking a briefcase. He, along with the Female Soldier and Sniper use jet packs to chase the Freelancer's Warthog. It is during this fight that the Sleeveless Soldier takes a pistol and shoots Maine in the throat, revealing how Maine became unable to speak.

He reappears in Season 10 at the Insurrectionist base. When the Freelancers attack the Insurrection base, he works with the Female and the Demo Man to fight the Freelancers. He gives chase to Carolina but is stopped when a drop pod lands in between them. The door is kicked open, revealing an angered Maine inside. When his AI, Sigma, points the Soldier out to Maine as the one from the highway that shot him in the throat, Maine then punches him in the head hard enough to rip it off.

Insurrectionist LeaderThe Insurrectionist Leader (Michael Joplin) is a high-ranking member of the Insurrection, recognized by the pill symbol on his chest. He seems to have a close relationship with C.T. as he is the only person she lets call her Connie. He first appears walking down a highway with other high-ranking Insurrectionists, carrying a briefcase. In the Chapter 19 he is seen talking to C.T. over video chat, but she is interrupted by Washington.

In Season 10, he appears in the space ship graveyard along two other Insurrectionist Soldiers. While the Freelancers search for him, C.T. sneaks away to his location and hands him a data file. Later when the Freelancers search Bone Valley, the Leader commands an Insurrectionist destroyer ship, 'The Staff of Charon', and attacks the Freelancer frigate. The two ships fight but the Insurrection Leader escapes into Slipspace, leaving behind a nuclear device. However, the Freelancers and the frigate manage to escape the explosion.

Later, he appears with C.T. entering the Insurrectionist base, while Wyoming spies on them. His companions are not pleased to see C.T., as they distrust her. When the Freelancers attack, C.T. is surprised that her "friends" found her so fast and the two overlook the battle through cameras. While he and C.T. head to a bunker, he notices Florida up on a ledge. He throws a tomahawk at him, knocking him off. Suddenly, Wyoming snipes at him, shooting him in the foot, causing him and C.T. to retreat. While C.T. proposes that they leave to escape the Freelancers, he refuses to leave without his teammates. As the two argue, Tex and Carolina break into the bunker. While C.T. tries to explain that the Director is using the Freelancers, Tex is angered and attacks her. Eventually, Tex mortally wounds C.T., but the Leader manages to escape with C.T. in an escape pod. C.T. hands him another file, containing the location of an artifact, before dying in his arms. Stricken with grief, he puts on her helmet, revealing that he took on C.T.'s identity.

The soldier now known as C.T. appears in the desert excavation site where he claims to be working with a team of humans and aliens to uncover a structure. Tucker later reveals that he had in fact killed the actual dig crew. C.T. first appeared as the driver of an Elephant, assisting Sarge, Grif, and Caboose through an active minefield protecting the location of the temple. He appeared in the following chapter physically and introduced one of his alien "co-workers", Smith. He allows the trio to scavenge spare parts to fix their jeep so they can depart swiftly, but secretly makes plans to "deal with" them to Smith. When the temple door opens, he leads the dig team to try to kill Tucker, but is forced to call a retreat. After breaching the temple, C.T. manages to capture Epsilon-Church, angering the Aliens and causing them to revolt. C.T. flees the temple with Epsilon-Church while the Reds, Blues, and the Aliens give chase. Eventually the Reds and Blues catch up, destroy C.T.'s jeep, and he is finally killed by Epsilon-Church after refusing to reveal his identity.

Insurrection Turret SoldiersThe Insurrectionist Turret Soldiers''' (Michael Jones and Lindsay Tuggey) are a pair Insurrection soldiers that wield large turrets. One has a happy face painted on their visor and turret while the other has a sad face, and they both carry ammo canisters on their back. One of them first appears in Season 10'', Chapter 7, spray painting a turret yellow. In Chapter 9, they appear again, guarding C.T. and the Insurrection Leader. Wyoming and Florida watch from above, but the Leader notices Florida and throws a tomahawk at him, causing him to fall. The Leader then orders the two Turret Soldiers to suppress the area. Carolina, York and Wash soon join the fight and attempt to figure out how to bypass the soldiers when a cloaked Tex sprints past them. In anger, Carolina follows Tex using her Super Speed leaving the rest to fend for themselves. However, Florida picks himself up and uses a grenade launcher to shoot a crane holding a crate, knocking the two Turret Soldiers off of the platform. The crate then falls on the two killing them, and leaving a large yellow stain from their paint canisters.

Other

Black Lotus
The Black Lotus is an Alien AI construct who protects the ultimate power, the Armor. When Zero gains the Armor, he kept an eye on him to see if he was worthy. When Zero was defeated, he took Zero with him, telling him that they have a long and painful path ahead of them.

Ruben Lozano

Drill Sergeant Hammer

Special Officer Lemons

Hank Daggerknife

Johnson MacGruff

Corporal Clint Buckshot

Lieutenant Miller

Informant guy

The Cyclops

References

External links 
 
 RoosterTooths.com – an unofficial Red vs Blue resource website

Red vs. Blue